

466001–466100 

|-bgcolor=#d6d6d6
| 466001 ||  || — || May 5, 2006 || Mount Lemmon || Mount Lemmon Survey || — || align=right | 3.6 km || 
|-id=002 bgcolor=#d6d6d6
| 466002 ||  || — || October 8, 2008 || Mount Lemmon || Mount Lemmon Survey || — || align=right | 2.6 km || 
|-id=003 bgcolor=#d6d6d6
| 466003 ||  || — || February 13, 2011 || Mount Lemmon || Mount Lemmon Survey || — || align=right | 3.4 km || 
|-id=004 bgcolor=#d6d6d6
| 466004 ||  || — || March 3, 2010 || WISE || WISE || — || align=right | 2.6 km || 
|-id=005 bgcolor=#d6d6d6
| 466005 ||  || — || April 24, 2006 || Kitt Peak || Spacewatch || — || align=right | 2.1 km || 
|-id=006 bgcolor=#d6d6d6
| 466006 ||  || — || May 23, 2006 || Kitt Peak || Spacewatch || — || align=right | 2.9 km || 
|-id=007 bgcolor=#d6d6d6
| 466007 ||  || — || November 25, 2009 || Kitt Peak || Spacewatch || — || align=right | 2.5 km || 
|-id=008 bgcolor=#d6d6d6
| 466008 ||  || — || April 30, 2006 || Kitt Peak || Spacewatch || HYG || align=right | 2.4 km || 
|-id=009 bgcolor=#d6d6d6
| 466009 ||  || — || April 1, 2011 || Kitt Peak || Spacewatch || — || align=right | 2.5 km || 
|-id=010 bgcolor=#E9E9E9
| 466010 ||  || — || September 7, 2008 || Mount Lemmon || Mount Lemmon Survey || MRX || align=right | 1.0 km || 
|-id=011 bgcolor=#E9E9E9
| 466011 ||  || — || September 16, 2009 || Mount Lemmon || Mount Lemmon Survey || — || align=right | 1.7 km || 
|-id=012 bgcolor=#d6d6d6
| 466012 ||  || — || January 8, 2010 || Mount Lemmon || Mount Lemmon Survey || — || align=right | 2.7 km || 
|-id=013 bgcolor=#d6d6d6
| 466013 ||  || — || April 7, 2006 || Kitt Peak || Spacewatch || — || align=right | 2.6 km || 
|-id=014 bgcolor=#d6d6d6
| 466014 ||  || — || March 13, 2011 || Mount Lemmon || Mount Lemmon Survey || — || align=right | 1.9 km || 
|-id=015 bgcolor=#d6d6d6
| 466015 ||  || — || May 2, 2006 || Mount Lemmon || Mount Lemmon Survey || — || align=right | 3.7 km || 
|-id=016 bgcolor=#d6d6d6
| 466016 ||  || — || October 25, 2008 || Mount Lemmon || Mount Lemmon Survey || EOS || align=right | 2.1 km || 
|-id=017 bgcolor=#d6d6d6
| 466017 ||  || — || January 28, 2006 || Kitt Peak || Spacewatch || — || align=right | 2.2 km || 
|-id=018 bgcolor=#d6d6d6
| 466018 ||  || — || July 16, 2007 || Siding Spring || SSS || — || align=right | 3.3 km || 
|-id=019 bgcolor=#d6d6d6
| 466019 ||  || — || April 26, 2000 || Kitt Peak || Spacewatch || — || align=right | 3.0 km || 
|-id=020 bgcolor=#d6d6d6
| 466020 ||  || — || April 27, 2011 || Kitt Peak || Spacewatch || EOS || align=right | 2.3 km || 
|-id=021 bgcolor=#d6d6d6
| 466021 ||  || — || April 26, 2011 || Kitt Peak || Spacewatch || EOS || align=right | 1.8 km || 
|-id=022 bgcolor=#d6d6d6
| 466022 ||  || — || March 4, 2005 || Mount Lemmon || Mount Lemmon Survey || — || align=right | 2.4 km || 
|-id=023 bgcolor=#d6d6d6
| 466023 ||  || — || March 15, 2005 || Catalina || CSS || — || align=right | 3.5 km || 
|-id=024 bgcolor=#d6d6d6
| 466024 ||  || — || April 6, 2011 || Mount Lemmon || Mount Lemmon Survey || — || align=right | 2.6 km || 
|-id=025 bgcolor=#d6d6d6
| 466025 ||  || — || March 10, 2005 || Mount Lemmon || Mount Lemmon Survey || — || align=right | 2.7 km || 
|-id=026 bgcolor=#fefefe
| 466026 ||  || — || October 16, 2009 || Catalina || CSS || H || align=right data-sort-value="0.52" | 520 m || 
|-id=027 bgcolor=#d6d6d6
| 466027 ||  || — || March 12, 2011 || Mount Lemmon || Mount Lemmon Survey || — || align=right | 3.0 km || 
|-id=028 bgcolor=#d6d6d6
| 466028 ||  || — || April 25, 2006 || Catalina || CSS || — || align=right | 2.6 km || 
|-id=029 bgcolor=#d6d6d6
| 466029 ||  || — || March 27, 2011 || Mount Lemmon || Mount Lemmon Survey || — || align=right | 2.4 km || 
|-id=030 bgcolor=#d6d6d6
| 466030 ||  || — || February 14, 2010 || Mount Lemmon || Mount Lemmon Survey || — || align=right | 2.6 km || 
|-id=031 bgcolor=#d6d6d6
| 466031 ||  || — || February 15, 2010 || Mount Lemmon || Mount Lemmon Survey || — || align=right | 2.8 km || 
|-id=032 bgcolor=#d6d6d6
| 466032 ||  || — || May 10, 2010 || WISE || WISE || — || align=right | 2.6 km || 
|-id=033 bgcolor=#d6d6d6
| 466033 ||  || — || January 7, 2010 || Mount Lemmon || Mount Lemmon Survey || — || align=right | 2.7 km || 
|-id=034 bgcolor=#d6d6d6
| 466034 ||  || — || May 7, 2011 || Kitt Peak || Spacewatch || — || align=right | 1.9 km || 
|-id=035 bgcolor=#d6d6d6
| 466035 ||  || — || May 30, 2006 || Kitt Peak || Spacewatch || — || align=right | 2.8 km || 
|-id=036 bgcolor=#d6d6d6
| 466036 ||  || — || April 25, 2010 || WISE || WISE || — || align=right | 4.9 km || 
|-id=037 bgcolor=#d6d6d6
| 466037 ||  || — || December 3, 2008 || Catalina || CSS || — || align=right | 3.7 km || 
|-id=038 bgcolor=#d6d6d6
| 466038 ||  || — || April 27, 2010 || WISE || WISE || Tj (2.95) || align=right | 3.5 km || 
|-id=039 bgcolor=#fefefe
| 466039 ||  || — || December 2, 1999 || Kitt Peak || Spacewatch || H || align=right data-sort-value="0.54" | 540 m || 
|-id=040 bgcolor=#d6d6d6
| 466040 ||  || — || May 22, 2011 || Mount Lemmon || Mount Lemmon Survey || EOS || align=right | 1.7 km || 
|-id=041 bgcolor=#d6d6d6
| 466041 ||  || — || September 13, 2007 || Mount Lemmon || Mount Lemmon Survey || EOS || align=right | 1.7 km || 
|-id=042 bgcolor=#d6d6d6
| 466042 ||  || — || September 13, 2007 || Kitt Peak || Spacewatch || — || align=right | 2.8 km || 
|-id=043 bgcolor=#d6d6d6
| 466043 ||  || — || April 16, 2010 || WISE || WISE || — || align=right | 5.2 km || 
|-id=044 bgcolor=#d6d6d6
| 466044 ||  || — || February 15, 2010 || Mount Lemmon || Mount Lemmon Survey || — || align=right | 2.4 km || 
|-id=045 bgcolor=#d6d6d6
| 466045 ||  || — || October 8, 2007 || Mount Lemmon || Mount Lemmon Survey || TIR || align=right | 2.5 km || 
|-id=046 bgcolor=#d6d6d6
| 466046 ||  || — || May 1, 2011 || Kitt Peak || Spacewatch || — || align=right | 2.7 km || 
|-id=047 bgcolor=#d6d6d6
| 466047 ||  || — || May 20, 2010 || WISE || WISE || — || align=right | 4.2 km || 
|-id=048 bgcolor=#d6d6d6
| 466048 ||  || — || April 26, 2011 || Kitt Peak || Spacewatch || — || align=right | 2.2 km || 
|-id=049 bgcolor=#d6d6d6
| 466049 ||  || — || February 1, 2005 || Kitt Peak || Spacewatch || — || align=right | 2.5 km || 
|-id=050 bgcolor=#d6d6d6
| 466050 ||  || — || June 18, 2010 || WISE || WISE || — || align=right | 3.5 km || 
|-id=051 bgcolor=#d6d6d6
| 466051 ||  || — || July 28, 2011 || Siding Spring || SSS || — || align=right | 3.2 km || 
|-id=052 bgcolor=#d6d6d6
| 466052 ||  || — || March 3, 2009 || Mount Lemmon || Mount Lemmon Survey || — || align=right | 3.9 km || 
|-id=053 bgcolor=#FFC2E0
| 466053 ||  || — || August 26, 2011 || Socorro || LINEAR || AMOcritical || align=right data-sort-value="0.54" | 540 m || 
|-id=054 bgcolor=#d6d6d6
| 466054 ||  || — || March 20, 2010 || Kitt Peak || Spacewatch || — || align=right | 2.2 km || 
|-id=055 bgcolor=#d6d6d6
| 466055 ||  || — || October 21, 2006 || Mount Lemmon || Mount Lemmon Survey || — || align=right | 3.6 km || 
|-id=056 bgcolor=#fefefe
| 466056 ||  || — || September 23, 2011 || Mount Lemmon || Mount Lemmon Survey || — || align=right data-sort-value="0.54" | 540 m || 
|-id=057 bgcolor=#fefefe
| 466057 ||  || — || September 23, 2011 || Kitt Peak || Spacewatch || — || align=right data-sort-value="0.90" | 900 m || 
|-id=058 bgcolor=#fefefe
| 466058 ||  || — || September 15, 2004 || Anderson Mesa || LONEOS || — || align=right | 2.9 km || 
|-id=059 bgcolor=#fefefe
| 466059 ||  || — || September 21, 2011 || Kitt Peak || Spacewatch || — || align=right data-sort-value="0.73" | 730 m || 
|-id=060 bgcolor=#fefefe
| 466060 ||  || — || November 22, 2008 || Kitt Peak || Spacewatch || — || align=right data-sort-value="0.63" | 630 m || 
|-id=061 bgcolor=#fefefe
| 466061 ||  || — || October 21, 2008 || Kitt Peak || Spacewatch || — || align=right data-sort-value="0.53" | 530 m || 
|-id=062 bgcolor=#fefefe
| 466062 ||  || — || October 20, 2011 || Mount Lemmon || Mount Lemmon Survey || — || align=right data-sort-value="0.57" | 570 m || 
|-id=063 bgcolor=#fefefe
| 466063 ||  || — || October 19, 2011 || Mount Lemmon || Mount Lemmon Survey || — || align=right data-sort-value="0.63" | 630 m || 
|-id=064 bgcolor=#fefefe
| 466064 ||  || — || February 2, 2009 || Catalina || CSS || — || align=right data-sort-value="0.68" | 680 m || 
|-id=065 bgcolor=#fefefe
| 466065 ||  || — || January 21, 2006 || Kitt Peak || Spacewatch || — || align=right data-sort-value="0.54" | 540 m || 
|-id=066 bgcolor=#fefefe
| 466066 ||  || — || December 22, 2008 || Mount Lemmon || Mount Lemmon Survey || — || align=right data-sort-value="0.51" | 510 m || 
|-id=067 bgcolor=#fefefe
| 466067 ||  || — || November 18, 2011 || Kitt Peak || Spacewatch || — || align=right data-sort-value="0.57" | 570 m || 
|-id=068 bgcolor=#fefefe
| 466068 ||  || — || December 30, 2008 || Mount Lemmon || Mount Lemmon Survey || — || align=right data-sort-value="0.54" | 540 m || 
|-id=069 bgcolor=#fefefe
| 466069 ||  || — || October 31, 2011 || Kitt Peak || Spacewatch || — || align=right data-sort-value="0.72" | 720 m || 
|-id=070 bgcolor=#d6d6d6
| 466070 ||  || — || October 7, 2010 || Catalina || CSS || 3:2 || align=right | 4.7 km || 
|-id=071 bgcolor=#fefefe
| 466071 ||  || — || November 11, 2004 || Kitt Peak || Spacewatch || — || align=right data-sort-value="0.56" | 560 m || 
|-id=072 bgcolor=#fefefe
| 466072 ||  || — || November 28, 2011 || Mount Lemmon || Mount Lemmon Survey || — || align=right data-sort-value="0.77" | 770 m || 
|-id=073 bgcolor=#fefefe
| 466073 ||  || — || September 14, 2007 || Mount Lemmon || Mount Lemmon Survey || — || align=right data-sort-value="0.61" | 610 m || 
|-id=074 bgcolor=#fefefe
| 466074 ||  || — || December 25, 2011 || Kitt Peak || Spacewatch || — || align=right data-sort-value="0.71" | 710 m || 
|-id=075 bgcolor=#fefefe
| 466075 ||  || — || August 13, 2010 || Kitt Peak || Spacewatch || V || align=right data-sort-value="0.54" | 540 m || 
|-id=076 bgcolor=#fefefe
| 466076 ||  || — || December 30, 2011 || Mount Lemmon || Mount Lemmon Survey || — || align=right data-sort-value="0.78" | 780 m || 
|-id=077 bgcolor=#fefefe
| 466077 ||  || — || November 8, 2007 || Kitt Peak || Spacewatch || — || align=right data-sort-value="0.60" | 600 m || 
|-id=078 bgcolor=#fefefe
| 466078 ||  || — || January 4, 2012 || Mount Lemmon || Mount Lemmon Survey || — || align=right data-sort-value="0.74" | 740 m || 
|-id=079 bgcolor=#fefefe
| 466079 ||  || — || February 2, 2009 || Kitt Peak || Spacewatch || — || align=right data-sort-value="0.81" | 810 m || 
|-id=080 bgcolor=#fefefe
| 466080 ||  || — || January 3, 2012 || Mount Lemmon || Mount Lemmon Survey || — || align=right data-sort-value="0.86" | 860 m || 
|-id=081 bgcolor=#fefefe
| 466081 ||  || — || March 18, 2009 || Kitt Peak || Spacewatch || — || align=right data-sort-value="0.67" | 670 m || 
|-id=082 bgcolor=#fefefe
| 466082 ||  || — || December 29, 2011 || Kitt Peak || Spacewatch || — || align=right data-sort-value="0.64" | 640 m || 
|-id=083 bgcolor=#fefefe
| 466083 ||  || — || December 16, 2007 || Kitt Peak || Spacewatch || — || align=right data-sort-value="0.73" | 730 m || 
|-id=084 bgcolor=#FA8072
| 466084 ||  || — || December 30, 2000 || Socorro || LINEAR || — || align=right data-sort-value="0.71" | 710 m || 
|-id=085 bgcolor=#fefefe
| 466085 ||  || — || January 21, 2012 || Kitt Peak || Spacewatch || — || align=right data-sort-value="0.69" | 690 m || 
|-id=086 bgcolor=#fefefe
| 466086 ||  || — || March 11, 2005 || Kitt Peak || Spacewatch || — || align=right data-sort-value="0.60" | 600 m || 
|-id=087 bgcolor=#fefefe
| 466087 ||  || — || January 26, 2012 || Kitt Peak || Spacewatch || — || align=right data-sort-value="0.73" | 730 m || 
|-id=088 bgcolor=#fefefe
| 466088 ||  || — || January 27, 2012 || Kitt Peak || Spacewatch || — || align=right data-sort-value="0.77" | 770 m || 
|-id=089 bgcolor=#fefefe
| 466089 ||  || — || August 13, 2010 || Kitt Peak || Spacewatch || V || align=right data-sort-value="0.74" | 740 m || 
|-id=090 bgcolor=#fefefe
| 466090 ||  || — || August 21, 2006 || Kitt Peak || Spacewatch || — || align=right data-sort-value="0.54" | 540 m || 
|-id=091 bgcolor=#fefefe
| 466091 ||  || — || November 15, 2007 || Mount Lemmon || Mount Lemmon Survey || — || align=right data-sort-value="0.91" | 910 m || 
|-id=092 bgcolor=#fefefe
| 466092 ||  || — || February 19, 2001 || Socorro || LINEAR || — || align=right data-sort-value="0.87" | 870 m || 
|-id=093 bgcolor=#fefefe
| 466093 ||  || — || September 17, 2010 || Mount Lemmon || Mount Lemmon Survey || NYS || align=right data-sort-value="0.55" | 550 m || 
|-id=094 bgcolor=#fefefe
| 466094 ||  || — || December 4, 2007 || Mount Lemmon || Mount Lemmon Survey || — || align=right | 1.0 km || 
|-id=095 bgcolor=#C2FFFF
| 466095 ||  || — || January 15, 2010 || WISE || WISE || L4 || align=right | 12 km || 
|-id=096 bgcolor=#fefefe
| 466096 ||  || — || February 17, 2001 || Kitt Peak || Spacewatch || MAS || align=right data-sort-value="0.52" | 520 m || 
|-id=097 bgcolor=#fefefe
| 466097 ||  || — || February 2, 2012 || Kitt Peak || Spacewatch || NYS || align=right data-sort-value="0.59" | 590 m || 
|-id=098 bgcolor=#fefefe
| 466098 ||  || — || December 30, 2007 || Kitt Peak || Spacewatch || — || align=right data-sort-value="0.58" | 580 m || 
|-id=099 bgcolor=#fefefe
| 466099 ||  || — || September 17, 2003 || Kitt Peak || Spacewatch || — || align=right data-sort-value="0.67" | 670 m || 
|-id=100 bgcolor=#fefefe
| 466100 ||  || — || April 7, 2005 || Kitt Peak || Spacewatch || — || align=right data-sort-value="0.65" | 650 m || 
|}

466101–466200 

|-bgcolor=#fefefe
| 466101 ||  || — || January 4, 2012 || Mount Lemmon || Mount Lemmon Survey || — || align=right data-sort-value="0.68" | 680 m || 
|-id=102 bgcolor=#fefefe
| 466102 ||  || — || November 5, 2007 || Kitt Peak || Spacewatch || — || align=right data-sort-value="0.75" | 750 m || 
|-id=103 bgcolor=#fefefe
| 466103 ||  || — || November 11, 2007 || Mount Lemmon || Mount Lemmon Survey || — || align=right data-sort-value="0.72" | 720 m || 
|-id=104 bgcolor=#fefefe
| 466104 ||  || — || January 21, 2012 || Kitt Peak || Spacewatch || — || align=right data-sort-value="0.61" | 610 m || 
|-id=105 bgcolor=#fefefe
| 466105 ||  || — || March 11, 2005 || Mount Lemmon || Mount Lemmon Survey || NYS || align=right data-sort-value="0.50" | 500 m || 
|-id=106 bgcolor=#fefefe
| 466106 ||  || — || December 31, 2007 || Mount Lemmon || Mount Lemmon Survey || NYS || align=right data-sort-value="0.69" | 690 m || 
|-id=107 bgcolor=#fefefe
| 466107 ||  || — || December 4, 2007 || Mount Lemmon || Mount Lemmon Survey || NYS || align=right data-sort-value="0.54" | 540 m || 
|-id=108 bgcolor=#fefefe
| 466108 ||  || — || April 24, 2001 || Kitt Peak || Spacewatch || — || align=right data-sort-value="0.59" | 590 m || 
|-id=109 bgcolor=#fefefe
| 466109 ||  || — || January 11, 2008 || Kitt Peak || Spacewatch || — || align=right data-sort-value="0.57" | 570 m || 
|-id=110 bgcolor=#fefefe
| 466110 ||  || — || April 4, 2005 || Mount Lemmon || Mount Lemmon Survey || — || align=right data-sort-value="0.54" | 540 m || 
|-id=111 bgcolor=#fefefe
| 466111 ||  || — || February 19, 2012 || Kitt Peak || Spacewatch || — || align=right data-sort-value="0.57" | 570 m || 
|-id=112 bgcolor=#fefefe
| 466112 ||  || — || February 11, 2008 || Kitt Peak || Spacewatch || — || align=right data-sort-value="0.68" | 680 m || 
|-id=113 bgcolor=#fefefe
| 466113 ||  || — || February 3, 2008 || Kitt Peak || Spacewatch || — || align=right data-sort-value="0.69" | 690 m || 
|-id=114 bgcolor=#fefefe
| 466114 ||  || — || December 28, 2011 || Mount Lemmon || Mount Lemmon Survey || — || align=right data-sort-value="0.70" | 700 m || 
|-id=115 bgcolor=#fefefe
| 466115 ||  || — || February 8, 2008 || Kitt Peak || Spacewatch || — || align=right data-sort-value="0.57" | 570 m || 
|-id=116 bgcolor=#fefefe
| 466116 ||  || — || February 2, 2008 || Mount Lemmon || Mount Lemmon Survey || — || align=right data-sort-value="0.68" | 680 m || 
|-id=117 bgcolor=#fefefe
| 466117 ||  || — || January 27, 2012 || Kitt Peak || Spacewatch || — || align=right data-sort-value="0.71" | 710 m || 
|-id=118 bgcolor=#fefefe
| 466118 ||  || — || January 19, 2012 || Kitt Peak || Spacewatch || — || align=right data-sort-value="0.69" | 690 m || 
|-id=119 bgcolor=#fefefe
| 466119 ||  || — || January 20, 2012 || Kitt Peak || Spacewatch || — || align=right data-sort-value="0.75" | 750 m || 
|-id=120 bgcolor=#fefefe
| 466120 ||  || — || February 2, 2008 || Catalina || CSS || — || align=right data-sort-value="0.69" | 690 m || 
|-id=121 bgcolor=#fefefe
| 466121 ||  || — || November 6, 2010 || Mount Lemmon || Mount Lemmon Survey || CLA || align=right | 1.3 km || 
|-id=122 bgcolor=#fefefe
| 466122 ||  || — || December 31, 2007 || Kitt Peak || Spacewatch || — || align=right data-sort-value="0.75" | 750 m || 
|-id=123 bgcolor=#fefefe
| 466123 ||  || — || March 24, 2001 || Kitt Peak || Spacewatch || — || align=right data-sort-value="0.70" | 700 m || 
|-id=124 bgcolor=#fefefe
| 466124 ||  || — || June 19, 2009 || Kitt Peak || Spacewatch || — || align=right data-sort-value="0.73" | 730 m || 
|-id=125 bgcolor=#fefefe
| 466125 ||  || — || March 14, 2012 || Catalina || CSS || — || align=right data-sort-value="0.91" | 910 m || 
|-id=126 bgcolor=#E9E9E9
| 466126 ||  || — || February 3, 2012 || Mount Lemmon || Mount Lemmon Survey || — || align=right data-sort-value="0.84" | 840 m || 
|-id=127 bgcolor=#E9E9E9
| 466127 ||  || — || September 29, 2005 || Kitt Peak || Spacewatch || — || align=right | 2.4 km || 
|-id=128 bgcolor=#E9E9E9
| 466128 ||  || — || April 12, 2008 || Mount Lemmon || Mount Lemmon Survey || — || align=right data-sort-value="0.67" | 670 m || 
|-id=129 bgcolor=#E9E9E9
| 466129 ||  || — || December 13, 2006 || Mount Lemmon || Mount Lemmon Survey || — || align=right | 1.1 km || 
|-id=130 bgcolor=#FFC2E0
| 466130 ||  || — || March 23, 2012 || Siding Spring || SSS || APO +1kmPHA || align=right data-sort-value="0.80" | 800 m || 
|-id=131 bgcolor=#E9E9E9
| 466131 ||  || — || September 25, 2009 || Mount Lemmon || Mount Lemmon Survey || critical || align=right | 1.6 km || 
|-id=132 bgcolor=#E9E9E9
| 466132 ||  || — || March 25, 2012 || Mount Lemmon || Mount Lemmon Survey || — || align=right | 1.4 km || 
|-id=133 bgcolor=#E9E9E9
| 466133 ||  || — || September 14, 2009 || Kitt Peak || Spacewatch || — || align=right | 1.9 km || 
|-id=134 bgcolor=#fefefe
| 466134 ||  || — || February 26, 2008 || Kitt Peak || Spacewatch || (6769) || align=right data-sort-value="0.61" | 610 m || 
|-id=135 bgcolor=#E9E9E9
| 466135 ||  || — || April 3, 2008 || Kitt Peak || Spacewatch || — || align=right | 1.2 km || 
|-id=136 bgcolor=#fefefe
| 466136 ||  || — || December 13, 1999 || Kitt Peak || Spacewatch || — || align=right data-sort-value="0.75" | 750 m || 
|-id=137 bgcolor=#E9E9E9
| 466137 ||  || — || February 25, 2012 || Mount Lemmon || Mount Lemmon Survey || — || align=right data-sort-value="0.89" | 890 m || 
|-id=138 bgcolor=#E9E9E9
| 466138 ||  || — || March 24, 2012 || Kitt Peak || Spacewatch || — || align=right data-sort-value="0.80" | 800 m || 
|-id=139 bgcolor=#E9E9E9
| 466139 ||  || — || December 2, 2010 || Mount Lemmon || Mount Lemmon Survey || — || align=right | 1.2 km || 
|-id=140 bgcolor=#E9E9E9
| 466140 ||  || — || April 16, 2012 || Catalina || CSS || — || align=right | 1.7 km || 
|-id=141 bgcolor=#E9E9E9
| 466141 ||  || — || January 10, 2011 || Kitt Peak || Spacewatch || — || align=right | 1.6 km || 
|-id=142 bgcolor=#E9E9E9
| 466142 ||  || — || May 27, 2008 || Mount Lemmon || Mount Lemmon Survey || — || align=right | 1.7 km || 
|-id=143 bgcolor=#fefefe
| 466143 ||  || — || June 30, 2005 || Kitt Peak || Spacewatch || — || align=right data-sort-value="0.80" | 800 m || 
|-id=144 bgcolor=#E9E9E9
| 466144 ||  || — || April 14, 2008 || Kitt Peak || Spacewatch || — || align=right data-sort-value="0.98" | 980 m || 
|-id=145 bgcolor=#E9E9E9
| 466145 ||  || — || April 22, 2012 || Kitt Peak || Spacewatch || EUN || align=right data-sort-value="0.96" | 960 m || 
|-id=146 bgcolor=#E9E9E9
| 466146 ||  || — || March 2, 2010 || WISE || WISE || — || align=right | 3.9 km || 
|-id=147 bgcolor=#E9E9E9
| 466147 ||  || — || May 6, 2008 || Mount Lemmon || Mount Lemmon Survey || — || align=right | 1.3 km || 
|-id=148 bgcolor=#E9E9E9
| 466148 ||  || — || February 6, 2007 || Mount Lemmon || Mount Lemmon Survey || — || align=right | 1.4 km || 
|-id=149 bgcolor=#E9E9E9
| 466149 ||  || — || January 27, 2011 || Mount Lemmon || Mount Lemmon Survey || — || align=right | 1.7 km || 
|-id=150 bgcolor=#E9E9E9
| 466150 ||  || — || September 20, 2009 || Kitt Peak || Spacewatch || — || align=right | 1.0 km || 
|-id=151 bgcolor=#E9E9E9
| 466151 ||  || — || April 28, 2012 || Mount Lemmon || Mount Lemmon Survey || — || align=right | 1.4 km || 
|-id=152 bgcolor=#E9E9E9
| 466152 ||  || — || October 25, 2005 || Kitt Peak || Spacewatch || — || align=right | 1.1 km || 
|-id=153 bgcolor=#E9E9E9
| 466153 ||  || — || March 28, 2012 || Mount Lemmon || Mount Lemmon Survey || — || align=right | 1.4 km || 
|-id=154 bgcolor=#E9E9E9
| 466154 ||  || — || September 22, 2009 || Mount Lemmon || Mount Lemmon Survey || — || align=right | 1.3 km || 
|-id=155 bgcolor=#E9E9E9
| 466155 ||  || — || November 16, 2009 || Mount Lemmon || Mount Lemmon Survey || EUN || align=right | 1.3 km || 
|-id=156 bgcolor=#E9E9E9
| 466156 ||  || — || November 18, 2009 || Kitt Peak || Spacewatch || — || align=right | 2.4 km || 
|-id=157 bgcolor=#E9E9E9
| 466157 ||  || — || November 17, 2009 || Mount Lemmon || Mount Lemmon Survey || EUN || align=right | 1.2 km || 
|-id=158 bgcolor=#E9E9E9
| 466158 ||  || — || March 27, 2012 || Mount Lemmon || Mount Lemmon Survey || — || align=right | 1.4 km || 
|-id=159 bgcolor=#E9E9E9
| 466159 ||  || — || November 12, 2005 || Kitt Peak || Spacewatch || — || align=right | 1.8 km || 
|-id=160 bgcolor=#E9E9E9
| 466160 ||  || — || January 27, 2007 || Mount Lemmon || Mount Lemmon Survey || — || align=right | 1.1 km || 
|-id=161 bgcolor=#E9E9E9
| 466161 ||  || — || March 1, 2012 || Mount Lemmon || Mount Lemmon Survey || EUN || align=right data-sort-value="0.93" | 930 m || 
|-id=162 bgcolor=#fefefe
| 466162 ||  || — || April 19, 2012 || Kitt Peak || Spacewatch || — || align=right data-sort-value="0.88" | 880 m || 
|-id=163 bgcolor=#E9E9E9
| 466163 ||  || — || March 30, 2012 || Mount Lemmon || Mount Lemmon Survey || — || align=right | 2.1 km || 
|-id=164 bgcolor=#E9E9E9
| 466164 ||  || — || February 26, 2012 || Mount Lemmon || Mount Lemmon Survey || EUN || align=right | 1.7 km || 
|-id=165 bgcolor=#E9E9E9
| 466165 ||  || — || May 14, 2008 || Mount Lemmon || Mount Lemmon Survey || — || align=right data-sort-value="0.94" | 940 m || 
|-id=166 bgcolor=#E9E9E9
| 466166 ||  || — || May 12, 2012 || Mount Lemmon || Mount Lemmon Survey || — || align=right data-sort-value="0.87" | 870 m || 
|-id=167 bgcolor=#E9E9E9
| 466167 ||  || — || March 29, 2012 || Mount Lemmon || Mount Lemmon Survey || — || align=right data-sort-value="0.99" | 990 m || 
|-id=168 bgcolor=#E9E9E9
| 466168 ||  || — || May 1, 2012 || Mount Lemmon || Mount Lemmon Survey || — || align=right data-sort-value="0.89" | 890 m || 
|-id=169 bgcolor=#E9E9E9
| 466169 ||  || — || March 1, 2012 || Mount Lemmon || Mount Lemmon Survey || — || align=right | 1.9 km || 
|-id=170 bgcolor=#E9E9E9
| 466170 ||  || — || January 3, 2011 || Mount Lemmon || Mount Lemmon Survey || — || align=right | 1.5 km || 
|-id=171 bgcolor=#E9E9E9
| 466171 ||  || — || March 16, 2007 || Kitt Peak || Spacewatch || HOF || align=right | 2.3 km || 
|-id=172 bgcolor=#E9E9E9
| 466172 ||  || — || October 24, 2009 || Kitt Peak || Spacewatch || — || align=right | 2.0 km || 
|-id=173 bgcolor=#E9E9E9
| 466173 ||  || — || May 1, 2012 || Mount Lemmon || Mount Lemmon Survey || — || align=right | 1.1 km || 
|-id=174 bgcolor=#E9E9E9
| 466174 ||  || — || May 12, 2012 || Mount Lemmon || Mount Lemmon Survey || MRX || align=right | 1.1 km || 
|-id=175 bgcolor=#E9E9E9
| 466175 ||  || — || April 28, 2012 || Mount Lemmon || Mount Lemmon Survey || GEF || align=right | 1.4 km || 
|-id=176 bgcolor=#E9E9E9
| 466176 ||  || — || May 12, 2012 || Mount Lemmon || Mount Lemmon Survey || — || align=right | 1.0 km || 
|-id=177 bgcolor=#E9E9E9
| 466177 ||  || — || April 8, 2008 || Kitt Peak || Spacewatch || — || align=right data-sort-value="0.81" | 810 m || 
|-id=178 bgcolor=#E9E9E9
| 466178 ||  || — || April 21, 2012 || Mount Lemmon || Mount Lemmon Survey || — || align=right | 3.1 km || 
|-id=179 bgcolor=#E9E9E9
| 466179 ||  || — || May 14, 2012 || Mount Lemmon || Mount Lemmon Survey || — || align=right | 1.2 km || 
|-id=180 bgcolor=#E9E9E9
| 466180 ||  || — || April 20, 2012 || Kitt Peak || Spacewatch || (5) || align=right data-sort-value="0.69" | 690 m || 
|-id=181 bgcolor=#E9E9E9
| 466181 ||  || — || March 29, 2012 || Kitt Peak || Spacewatch || — || align=right data-sort-value="0.81" | 810 m || 
|-id=182 bgcolor=#E9E9E9
| 466182 ||  || — || June 27, 2008 || Siding Spring || SSS || — || align=right | 1.5 km || 
|-id=183 bgcolor=#E9E9E9
| 466183 ||  || — || October 9, 2004 || Kitt Peak || Spacewatch || — || align=right | 1.6 km || 
|-id=184 bgcolor=#E9E9E9
| 466184 ||  || — || January 26, 2007 || Kitt Peak || Spacewatch || — || align=right | 1.5 km || 
|-id=185 bgcolor=#E9E9E9
| 466185 ||  || — || May 14, 2008 || Mount Lemmon || Mount Lemmon Survey || — || align=right data-sort-value="0.89" | 890 m || 
|-id=186 bgcolor=#E9E9E9
| 466186 ||  || — || October 7, 2004 || Kitt Peak || Spacewatch || — || align=right | 2.1 km || 
|-id=187 bgcolor=#E9E9E9
| 466187 ||  || — || October 1, 2005 || Mount Lemmon || Mount Lemmon Survey || — || align=right | 1.7 km || 
|-id=188 bgcolor=#E9E9E9
| 466188 ||  || — || May 1, 2012 || Mount Lemmon || Mount Lemmon Survey || — || align=right data-sort-value="0.87" | 870 m || 
|-id=189 bgcolor=#E9E9E9
| 466189 ||  || — || July 16, 2004 || Socorro || LINEAR || — || align=right data-sort-value="0.93" | 930 m || 
|-id=190 bgcolor=#E9E9E9
| 466190 ||  || — || April 6, 2008 || Mount Lemmon || Mount Lemmon Survey || MAR || align=right | 1.1 km || 
|-id=191 bgcolor=#FFC2E0
| 466191 ||  || — || May 28, 2012 || Mount Lemmon || Mount Lemmon Survey || AMO || align=right data-sort-value="0.62" | 620 m || 
|-id=192 bgcolor=#E9E9E9
| 466192 ||  || — || October 27, 2005 || Kitt Peak || Spacewatch || — || align=right | 3.6 km || 
|-id=193 bgcolor=#E9E9E9
| 466193 ||  || — || May 21, 2012 || Mount Lemmon || Mount Lemmon Survey || — || align=right | 1.0 km || 
|-id=194 bgcolor=#E9E9E9
| 466194 ||  || — || July 30, 2008 || Catalina || CSS || JUN || align=right | 1.1 km || 
|-id=195 bgcolor=#E9E9E9
| 466195 ||  || — || January 17, 2007 || Mount Lemmon || Mount Lemmon Survey || — || align=right data-sort-value="0.98" | 980 m || 
|-id=196 bgcolor=#E9E9E9
| 466196 ||  || — || April 19, 2012 || Mount Lemmon || Mount Lemmon Survey || — || align=right | 2.0 km || 
|-id=197 bgcolor=#E9E9E9
| 466197 ||  || — || December 8, 2010 || Mount Lemmon || Mount Lemmon Survey || — || align=right | 2.3 km || 
|-id=198 bgcolor=#E9E9E9
| 466198 ||  || — || May 31, 2012 || Mount Lemmon || Mount Lemmon Survey || — || align=right | 2.2 km || 
|-id=199 bgcolor=#E9E9E9
| 466199 ||  || — || October 25, 2000 || Kitt Peak || Spacewatch || — || align=right | 1.4 km || 
|-id=200 bgcolor=#E9E9E9
| 466200 ||  || — || September 29, 2009 || Mount Lemmon || Mount Lemmon Survey || — || align=right | 1.4 km || 
|}

466201–466300 

|-bgcolor=#fefefe
| 466201 ||  || — || January 30, 2011 || Mount Lemmon || Mount Lemmon Survey || — || align=right | 1.1 km || 
|-id=202 bgcolor=#E9E9E9
| 466202 ||  || — || November 26, 2005 || Mount Lemmon || Mount Lemmon Survey || JUN || align=right | 1.0 km || 
|-id=203 bgcolor=#d6d6d6
| 466203 ||  || — || June 16, 2006 || Kitt Peak || Spacewatch || — || align=right | 2.4 km || 
|-id=204 bgcolor=#d6d6d6
| 466204 ||  || — || December 5, 2008 || Kitt Peak || Spacewatch || EOS || align=right | 1.7 km || 
|-id=205 bgcolor=#d6d6d6
| 466205 ||  || — || May 15, 2010 || WISE || WISE || — || align=right | 4.2 km || 
|-id=206 bgcolor=#d6d6d6
| 466206 ||  || — || September 12, 2007 || Kitt Peak || Spacewatch || EOS || align=right | 1.3 km || 
|-id=207 bgcolor=#d6d6d6
| 466207 ||  || — || November 18, 2007 || Mount Lemmon || Mount Lemmon Survey || — || align=right | 2.5 km || 
|-id=208 bgcolor=#d6d6d6
| 466208 ||  || — || December 30, 2008 || Mount Lemmon || Mount Lemmon Survey || — || align=right | 2.8 km || 
|-id=209 bgcolor=#C2FFFF
| 466209 ||  || — || August 25, 2012 || Kitt Peak || Spacewatch || L5 || align=right | 9.2 km || 
|-id=210 bgcolor=#d6d6d6
| 466210 ||  || — || September 10, 2007 || Kitt Peak || Spacewatch || — || align=right | 2.5 km || 
|-id=211 bgcolor=#d6d6d6
| 466211 ||  || — || April 2, 2011 || Kitt Peak || Spacewatch || — || align=right | 2.9 km || 
|-id=212 bgcolor=#E9E9E9
| 466212 ||  || — || March 28, 2011 || Mount Lemmon || Mount Lemmon Survey || — || align=right | 1.9 km || 
|-id=213 bgcolor=#d6d6d6
| 466213 ||  || — || June 10, 2011 || Mount Lemmon || Mount Lemmon Survey || — || align=right | 3.2 km || 
|-id=214 bgcolor=#d6d6d6
| 466214 ||  || — || October 10, 1996 || Kitt Peak || Spacewatch || — || align=right | 2.7 km || 
|-id=215 bgcolor=#d6d6d6
| 466215 ||  || — || August 28, 2006 || Catalina || CSS || — || align=right | 2.9 km || 
|-id=216 bgcolor=#FA8072
| 466216 ||  || — || February 25, 2011 || Kitt Peak || Spacewatch || H || align=right data-sort-value="0.45" | 450 m || 
|-id=217 bgcolor=#FA8072
| 466217 ||  || — || September 5, 2007 || Siding Spring || SSS || H || align=right data-sort-value="0.52" | 520 m || 
|-id=218 bgcolor=#d6d6d6
| 466218 ||  || — || August 16, 2006 || Siding Spring || SSS || — || align=right | 3.7 km || 
|-id=219 bgcolor=#d6d6d6
| 466219 ||  || — || March 15, 2004 || Kitt Peak || Spacewatch || EOS || align=right | 1.8 km || 
|-id=220 bgcolor=#FA8072
| 466220 ||  || — || October 21, 2008 || Mount Lemmon || Mount Lemmon Survey || — || align=right | 2.0 km || 
|-id=221 bgcolor=#d6d6d6
| 466221 ||  || — || November 5, 2007 || Kitt Peak || Spacewatch || — || align=right | 2.4 km || 
|-id=222 bgcolor=#d6d6d6
| 466222 ||  || — || September 14, 2007 || Mount Lemmon || Mount Lemmon Survey || — || align=right | 2.8 km || 
|-id=223 bgcolor=#fefefe
| 466223 ||  || — || May 21, 2006 || Kitt Peak || Spacewatch || H || align=right data-sort-value="0.53" | 530 m || 
|-id=224 bgcolor=#d6d6d6
| 466224 ||  || — || May 12, 2011 || Mount Lemmon || Mount Lemmon Survey || — || align=right | 3.1 km || 
|-id=225 bgcolor=#d6d6d6
| 466225 ||  || — || March 12, 2010 || Mount Lemmon || Mount Lemmon Survey || — || align=right | 2.8 km || 
|-id=226 bgcolor=#d6d6d6
| 466226 ||  || — || June 3, 2011 || Mount Lemmon || Mount Lemmon Survey || — || align=right | 2.8 km || 
|-id=227 bgcolor=#d6d6d6
| 466227 ||  || — || October 8, 2007 || Mount Lemmon || Mount Lemmon Survey || EOS || align=right | 1.7 km || 
|-id=228 bgcolor=#d6d6d6
| 466228 ||  || — || June 17, 2010 || WISE || WISE || — || align=right | 2.7 km || 
|-id=229 bgcolor=#d6d6d6
| 466229 ||  || — || August 27, 2006 || Anderson Mesa || LONEOS || THB || align=right | 2.5 km || 
|-id=230 bgcolor=#d6d6d6
| 466230 ||  || — || March 4, 2010 || Kitt Peak || Spacewatch || — || align=right | 3.2 km || 
|-id=231 bgcolor=#d6d6d6
| 466231 ||  || — || October 15, 2001 || Socorro || LINEAR || — || align=right | 3.9 km || 
|-id=232 bgcolor=#d6d6d6
| 466232 ||  || — || June 11, 2011 || Mount Lemmon || Mount Lemmon Survey || — || align=right | 3.2 km || 
|-id=233 bgcolor=#d6d6d6
| 466233 ||  || — || June 24, 2010 || WISE || WISE || — || align=right | 8.2 km || 
|-id=234 bgcolor=#d6d6d6
| 466234 ||  || — || October 2, 2006 || Mount Lemmon || Mount Lemmon Survey || 7:4 || align=right | 4.3 km || 
|-id=235 bgcolor=#d6d6d6
| 466235 ||  || — || September 18, 2006 || Kitt Peak || Spacewatch || THM || align=right | 2.6 km || 
|-id=236 bgcolor=#fefefe
| 466236 ||  || — || December 18, 2004 || Socorro || LINEAR || H || align=right data-sort-value="0.78" | 780 m || 
|-id=237 bgcolor=#fefefe
| 466237 ||  || — || January 4, 2013 || Kitt Peak || Spacewatch || H || align=right data-sort-value="0.84" | 840 m || 
|-id=238 bgcolor=#C2FFFF
| 466238 ||  || — || November 8, 2010 || Mount Lemmon || Mount Lemmon Survey || L4 || align=right | 7.8 km || 
|-id=239 bgcolor=#C2FFFF
| 466239 ||  || — || October 16, 2009 || Mount Lemmon || Mount Lemmon Survey || L4 || align=right | 7.0 km || 
|-id=240 bgcolor=#C2FFFF
| 466240 ||  || — || January 4, 2013 || Kitt Peak || Spacewatch || L4 || align=right | 8.4 km || 
|-id=241 bgcolor=#fefefe
| 466241 ||  || — || May 11, 2005 || Mount Lemmon || Mount Lemmon Survey || H || align=right data-sort-value="0.84" | 840 m || 
|-id=242 bgcolor=#fefefe
| 466242 ||  || — || April 15, 2008 || Catalina || CSS || H || align=right data-sort-value="0.79" | 790 m || 
|-id=243 bgcolor=#fefefe
| 466243 ||  || — || February 13, 2008 || Kitt Peak || Spacewatch || H || align=right data-sort-value="0.62" | 620 m || 
|-id=244 bgcolor=#C2FFFF
| 466244 ||  || — || January 1, 2012 || Mount Lemmon || Mount Lemmon Survey || L4 || align=right | 7.5 km || 
|-id=245 bgcolor=#C2FFFF
| 466245 ||  || — || September 28, 2009 || Mount Lemmon || Mount Lemmon Survey || L4 || align=right | 7.4 km || 
|-id=246 bgcolor=#fefefe
| 466246 ||  || — || February 9, 2002 || Kitt Peak || Spacewatch || H || align=right data-sort-value="0.57" | 570 m || 
|-id=247 bgcolor=#C2FFFF
| 466247 ||  || — || February 6, 2013 || Kitt Peak || Spacewatch || L4 || align=right | 9.0 km || 
|-id=248 bgcolor=#fefefe
| 466248 ||  || — || February 13, 2008 || Kitt Peak || Spacewatch || H || align=right data-sort-value="0.54" | 540 m || 
|-id=249 bgcolor=#fefefe
| 466249 ||  || — || February 17, 2013 || Kitt Peak || Spacewatch || H || align=right data-sort-value="0.80" | 800 m || 
|-id=250 bgcolor=#fefefe
| 466250 ||  || — || March 4, 2013 || Siding Spring || SSS || H || align=right data-sort-value="0.83" | 830 m || 
|-id=251 bgcolor=#fefefe
| 466251 ||  || — || April 11, 2010 || Kitt Peak || Spacewatch || — || align=right data-sort-value="0.72" | 720 m || 
|-id=252 bgcolor=#fefefe
| 466252 ||  || — || April 10, 2013 || Siding Spring || SSS || — || align=right data-sort-value="0.98" | 980 m || 
|-id=253 bgcolor=#fefefe
| 466253 ||  || — || April 11, 2013 || Kitt Peak || Spacewatch || — || align=right data-sort-value="0.62" | 620 m || 
|-id=254 bgcolor=#E9E9E9
| 466254 ||  || — || December 8, 2005 || Kitt Peak || Spacewatch || ADE || align=right | 2.0 km || 
|-id=255 bgcolor=#fefefe
| 466255 ||  || — || September 28, 2011 || Catalina || CSS || H || align=right data-sort-value="0.75" | 750 m || 
|-id=256 bgcolor=#fefefe
| 466256 ||  || — || July 7, 2010 || WISE || WISE || — || align=right | 1.7 km || 
|-id=257 bgcolor=#fefefe
| 466257 ||  || — || December 1, 2003 || Catalina || CSS || — || align=right | 2.2 km || 
|-id=258 bgcolor=#fefefe
| 466258 ||  || — || April 11, 2013 || Kitt Peak || Spacewatch || — || align=right data-sort-value="0.60" | 600 m || 
|-id=259 bgcolor=#fefefe
| 466259 ||  || — || March 2, 2006 || Kitt Peak || Spacewatch || — || align=right data-sort-value="0.60" | 600 m || 
|-id=260 bgcolor=#fefefe
| 466260 ||  || — || November 4, 2007 || Kitt Peak || Spacewatch || V || align=right data-sort-value="0.54" | 540 m || 
|-id=261 bgcolor=#fefefe
| 466261 ||  || — || September 3, 2007 || Catalina || CSS || — || align=right data-sort-value="0.68" | 680 m || 
|-id=262 bgcolor=#fefefe
| 466262 ||  || — || November 2, 2007 || Mount Lemmon || Mount Lemmon Survey || — || align=right data-sort-value="0.74" | 740 m || 
|-id=263 bgcolor=#fefefe
| 466263 ||  || — || November 7, 2007 || Catalina || CSS || — || align=right data-sort-value="0.87" | 870 m || 
|-id=264 bgcolor=#fefefe
| 466264 ||  || — || May 6, 2006 || Mount Lemmon || Mount Lemmon Survey || (2076) || align=right data-sort-value="0.74" | 740 m || 
|-id=265 bgcolor=#fefefe
| 466265 ||  || — || May 6, 2006 || Mount Lemmon || Mount Lemmon Survey || — || align=right data-sort-value="0.65" | 650 m || 
|-id=266 bgcolor=#fefefe
| 466266 ||  || — || September 21, 2007 || XuYi || PMO NEO || — || align=right data-sort-value="0.76" | 760 m || 
|-id=267 bgcolor=#E9E9E9
| 466267 ||  || — || August 20, 2004 || Catalina || CSS || — || align=right | 2.4 km || 
|-id=268 bgcolor=#FA8072
| 466268 ||  || — || November 27, 2010 || Mount Lemmon || Mount Lemmon Survey || — || align=right data-sort-value="0.53" | 530 m || 
|-id=269 bgcolor=#fefefe
| 466269 ||  || — || February 23, 2012 || Mount Lemmon || Mount Lemmon Survey || — || align=right data-sort-value="0.66" | 660 m || 
|-id=270 bgcolor=#fefefe
| 466270 ||  || — || March 16, 2009 || Kitt Peak || Spacewatch || MAS || align=right data-sort-value="0.66" | 660 m || 
|-id=271 bgcolor=#d6d6d6
| 466271 ||  || — || January 20, 2006 || Catalina || CSS || — || align=right | 4.2 km || 
|-id=272 bgcolor=#fefefe
| 466272 ||  || — || December 9, 2004 || Kitt Peak || Spacewatch || — || align=right data-sort-value="0.76" | 760 m || 
|-id=273 bgcolor=#fefefe
| 466273 ||  || — || February 20, 2006 || Kitt Peak || Spacewatch || — || align=right data-sort-value="0.60" | 600 m || 
|-id=274 bgcolor=#d6d6d6
| 466274 ||  || — || January 30, 2011 || Mount Lemmon || Mount Lemmon Survey || — || align=right | 3.1 km || 
|-id=275 bgcolor=#E9E9E9
| 466275 ||  || — || May 2, 2008 || Kitt Peak || Spacewatch || — || align=right | 1.2 km || 
|-id=276 bgcolor=#d6d6d6
| 466276 ||  || — || October 24, 2008 || Catalina || CSS || LIX || align=right | 3.6 km || 
|-id=277 bgcolor=#FA8072
| 466277 ||  || — || November 19, 2003 || Kitt Peak || Spacewatch || — || align=right data-sort-value="0.88" | 880 m || 
|-id=278 bgcolor=#E9E9E9
| 466278 ||  || — || October 15, 2009 || Mount Lemmon || Mount Lemmon Survey || — || align=right | 1.7 km || 
|-id=279 bgcolor=#d6d6d6
| 466279 ||  || — || December 22, 2008 || Catalina || CSS || Tj (2.98) || align=right | 3.6 km || 
|-id=280 bgcolor=#d6d6d6
| 466280 ||  || — || February 8, 2011 || Kitt Peak || Spacewatch || — || align=right | 2.2 km || 
|-id=281 bgcolor=#fefefe
| 466281 ||  || — || April 20, 2009 || Kitt Peak || Spacewatch || BAP || align=right data-sort-value="0.84" | 840 m || 
|-id=282 bgcolor=#fefefe
| 466282 ||  || — || March 13, 2012 || Mount Lemmon || Mount Lemmon Survey || — || align=right data-sort-value="0.71" | 710 m || 
|-id=283 bgcolor=#E9E9E9
| 466283 ||  || — || January 29, 2011 || Mount Lemmon || Mount Lemmon Survey || GEF || align=right | 1.1 km || 
|-id=284 bgcolor=#E9E9E9
| 466284 ||  || — || February 6, 2007 || Mount Lemmon || Mount Lemmon Survey || — || align=right | 1.2 km || 
|-id=285 bgcolor=#fefefe
| 466285 ||  || — || December 10, 2010 || Mount Lemmon || Mount Lemmon Survey || — || align=right | 1.0 km || 
|-id=286 bgcolor=#fefefe
| 466286 ||  || — || October 28, 1998 || Kitt Peak || Spacewatch || MAS || align=right data-sort-value="0.70" | 700 m || 
|-id=287 bgcolor=#fefefe
| 466287 ||  || — || October 17, 2010 || Mount Lemmon || Mount Lemmon Survey || — || align=right data-sort-value="0.72" | 720 m || 
|-id=288 bgcolor=#fefefe
| 466288 ||  || — || May 8, 2005 || Mount Lemmon || Mount Lemmon Survey || — || align=right data-sort-value="0.79" | 790 m || 
|-id=289 bgcolor=#fefefe
| 466289 ||  || — || September 26, 2006 || Mount Lemmon || Mount Lemmon Survey || NYS || align=right data-sort-value="0.48" | 480 m || 
|-id=290 bgcolor=#d6d6d6
| 466290 ||  || — || January 9, 2011 || Mount Lemmon || Mount Lemmon Survey || — || align=right | 3.7 km || 
|-id=291 bgcolor=#fefefe
| 466291 ||  || — || September 27, 2006 || Kitt Peak || Spacewatch || V || align=right data-sort-value="0.51" | 510 m || 
|-id=292 bgcolor=#fefefe
| 466292 ||  || — || October 17, 2010 || Mount Lemmon || Mount Lemmon Survey || — || align=right data-sort-value="0.86" | 860 m || 
|-id=293 bgcolor=#fefefe
| 466293 ||  || — || January 20, 2012 || Mount Lemmon || Mount Lemmon Survey || — || align=right data-sort-value="0.79" | 790 m || 
|-id=294 bgcolor=#E9E9E9
| 466294 ||  || — || March 29, 2008 || Mount Lemmon || Mount Lemmon Survey || — || align=right data-sort-value="0.78" | 780 m || 
|-id=295 bgcolor=#fefefe
| 466295 ||  || — || October 9, 2010 || Mount Lemmon || Mount Lemmon Survey || — || align=right data-sort-value="0.79" | 790 m || 
|-id=296 bgcolor=#fefefe
| 466296 ||  || — || March 9, 2008 || Mount Lemmon || Mount Lemmon Survey || — || align=right data-sort-value="0.79" | 790 m || 
|-id=297 bgcolor=#fefefe
| 466297 ||  || — || June 14, 1999 || Kitt Peak || Spacewatch || — || align=right data-sort-value="0.70" | 700 m || 
|-id=298 bgcolor=#d6d6d6
| 466298 ||  || — || July 30, 2008 || Siding Spring || SSS || — || align=right | 2.9 km || 
|-id=299 bgcolor=#E9E9E9
| 466299 ||  || — || September 11, 2004 || Kitt Peak || Spacewatch || — || align=right | 1.7 km || 
|-id=300 bgcolor=#fefefe
| 466300 ||  || — || April 18, 2009 || Kitt Peak || Spacewatch || — || align=right data-sort-value="0.67" | 670 m || 
|}

466301–466400 

|-bgcolor=#fefefe
| 466301 ||  || — || May 17, 2009 || Mount Lemmon || Mount Lemmon Survey || V || align=right data-sort-value="0.62" | 620 m || 
|-id=302 bgcolor=#fefefe
| 466302 ||  || — || August 18, 2006 || Kitt Peak || Spacewatch || — || align=right data-sort-value="0.94" | 940 m || 
|-id=303 bgcolor=#fefefe
| 466303 ||  || — || October 22, 2006 || Kitt Peak || Spacewatch || — || align=right data-sort-value="0.77" | 770 m || 
|-id=304 bgcolor=#fefefe
| 466304 ||  || — || April 8, 2002 || Kitt Peak || Spacewatch || — || align=right data-sort-value="0.46" | 460 m || 
|-id=305 bgcolor=#E9E9E9
| 466305 ||  || — || September 10, 2004 || Socorro || LINEAR || — || align=right | 1.9 km || 
|-id=306 bgcolor=#E9E9E9
| 466306 ||  || — || February 8, 2011 || Mount Lemmon || Mount Lemmon Survey || — || align=right | 1.8 km || 
|-id=307 bgcolor=#E9E9E9
| 466307 ||  || — || August 18, 2009 || Kitt Peak || Spacewatch || — || align=right data-sort-value="0.85" | 850 m || 
|-id=308 bgcolor=#fefefe
| 466308 ||  || — || October 31, 2006 || Mount Lemmon || Mount Lemmon Survey || — || align=right data-sort-value="0.86" | 860 m || 
|-id=309 bgcolor=#E9E9E9
| 466309 ||  || — || September 3, 2000 || Socorro || LINEAR || — || align=right | 1.7 km || 
|-id=310 bgcolor=#E9E9E9
| 466310 ||  || — || September 25, 2009 || Catalina || CSS || — || align=right | 1.2 km || 
|-id=311 bgcolor=#d6d6d6
| 466311 ||  || — || December 15, 2004 || Kitt Peak || Spacewatch || — || align=right | 2.7 km || 
|-id=312 bgcolor=#fefefe
| 466312 ||  || — || February 25, 2012 || Mount Lemmon || Mount Lemmon Survey || — || align=right data-sort-value="0.84" | 840 m || 
|-id=313 bgcolor=#E9E9E9
| 466313 ||  || — || December 25, 2010 || Mount Lemmon || Mount Lemmon Survey || — || align=right | 1.4 km || 
|-id=314 bgcolor=#d6d6d6
| 466314 ||  || — || September 23, 2008 || Mount Lemmon || Mount Lemmon Survey || — || align=right | 3.2 km || 
|-id=315 bgcolor=#E9E9E9
| 466315 ||  || — || February 3, 2006 || Mount Lemmon || Mount Lemmon Survey || — || align=right | 2.8 km || 
|-id=316 bgcolor=#fefefe
| 466316 ||  || — || July 28, 2013 || Kitt Peak || Spacewatch || NYS || align=right data-sort-value="0.53" | 530 m || 
|-id=317 bgcolor=#d6d6d6
| 466317 ||  || — || June 9, 2013 || Mount Lemmon || Mount Lemmon Survey || — || align=right | 3.2 km || 
|-id=318 bgcolor=#fefefe
| 466318 ||  || — || August 18, 2006 || Kitt Peak || Spacewatch || — || align=right data-sort-value="0.72" | 720 m || 
|-id=319 bgcolor=#fefefe
| 466319 ||  || — || March 5, 2008 || Mount Lemmon || Mount Lemmon Survey || — || align=right data-sort-value="0.83" | 830 m || 
|-id=320 bgcolor=#fefefe
| 466320 ||  || — || April 12, 2005 || Kitt Peak || Spacewatch || — || align=right data-sort-value="0.91" | 910 m || 
|-id=321 bgcolor=#E9E9E9
| 466321 ||  || — || February 7, 2011 || Mount Lemmon || Mount Lemmon Survey || — || align=right | 1.7 km || 
|-id=322 bgcolor=#E9E9E9
| 466322 ||  || — || February 25, 2011 || Mount Lemmon || Mount Lemmon Survey || — || align=right | 1.8 km || 
|-id=323 bgcolor=#fefefe
| 466323 ||  || — || August 19, 2006 || Kitt Peak || Spacewatch || — || align=right data-sort-value="0.64" | 640 m || 
|-id=324 bgcolor=#E9E9E9
| 466324 ||  || — || September 30, 2009 || Mount Lemmon || Mount Lemmon Survey || — || align=right | 1.0 km || 
|-id=325 bgcolor=#E9E9E9
| 466325 ||  || — || March 10, 2007 || Mount Lemmon || Mount Lemmon Survey || MRX || align=right data-sort-value="0.84" | 840 m || 
|-id=326 bgcolor=#E9E9E9
| 466326 ||  || — || December 30, 2005 || Kitt Peak || Spacewatch || — || align=right | 1.9 km || 
|-id=327 bgcolor=#d6d6d6
| 466327 ||  || — || August 12, 2013 || Kitt Peak || Spacewatch || KOR || align=right | 1.2 km || 
|-id=328 bgcolor=#E9E9E9
| 466328 ||  || — || October 27, 2005 || Kitt Peak || Spacewatch || — || align=right | 1.2 km || 
|-id=329 bgcolor=#E9E9E9
| 466329 ||  || — || September 26, 2000 || Socorro || LINEAR || — || align=right | 1.7 km || 
|-id=330 bgcolor=#E9E9E9
| 466330 ||  || — || April 1, 2012 || Mount Lemmon || Mount Lemmon Survey || KON || align=right | 2.1 km || 
|-id=331 bgcolor=#d6d6d6
| 466331 ||  || — || September 2, 2013 || Mount Lemmon || Mount Lemmon Survey || — || align=right | 2.5 km || 
|-id=332 bgcolor=#d6d6d6
| 466332 ||  || — || September 6, 2008 || Mount Lemmon || Mount Lemmon Survey || KOR || align=right | 1.2 km || 
|-id=333 bgcolor=#E9E9E9
| 466333 ||  || — || March 29, 2011 || Mount Lemmon || Mount Lemmon Survey || — || align=right | 2.5 km || 
|-id=334 bgcolor=#E9E9E9
| 466334 ||  || — || April 24, 2004 || Kitt Peak || Spacewatch || — || align=right | 1.5 km || 
|-id=335 bgcolor=#d6d6d6
| 466335 ||  || — || April 25, 2007 || Kitt Peak || Spacewatch || — || align=right | 2.8 km || 
|-id=336 bgcolor=#d6d6d6
| 466336 ||  || — || September 4, 2013 || Mount Lemmon || Mount Lemmon Survey || KOR || align=right | 1.3 km || 
|-id=337 bgcolor=#d6d6d6
| 466337 ||  || — || October 29, 2008 || Kitt Peak || Spacewatch || — || align=right | 2.4 km || 
|-id=338 bgcolor=#E9E9E9
| 466338 ||  || — || September 28, 2009 || Kitt Peak || Spacewatch || — || align=right data-sort-value="0.79" | 790 m || 
|-id=339 bgcolor=#E9E9E9
| 466339 ||  || — || September 3, 2013 || Kitt Peak || Spacewatch || — || align=right | 2.6 km || 
|-id=340 bgcolor=#fefefe
| 466340 ||  || — || November 17, 2006 || Kitt Peak || Spacewatch || — || align=right data-sort-value="0.75" | 750 m || 
|-id=341 bgcolor=#fefefe
| 466341 ||  || — || January 23, 2011 || Mount Lemmon || Mount Lemmon Survey || MAS || align=right data-sort-value="0.85" | 850 m || 
|-id=342 bgcolor=#d6d6d6
| 466342 ||  || — || September 3, 2013 || Kitt Peak || Spacewatch || THM || align=right | 2.1 km || 
|-id=343 bgcolor=#d6d6d6
| 466343 ||  || — || March 28, 2011 || Mount Lemmon || Mount Lemmon Survey || — || align=right | 2.6 km || 
|-id=344 bgcolor=#E9E9E9
| 466344 ||  || — || February 7, 2010 || WISE || WISE || ADE || align=right | 2.3 km || 
|-id=345 bgcolor=#d6d6d6
| 466345 ||  || — || January 8, 2010 || Kitt Peak || Spacewatch || EOS || align=right | 2.1 km || 
|-id=346 bgcolor=#E9E9E9
| 466346 ||  || — || March 28, 2012 || Kitt Peak || Spacewatch || — || align=right | 1.5 km || 
|-id=347 bgcolor=#E9E9E9
| 466347 ||  || — || November 9, 2009 || Kitt Peak || Spacewatch || — || align=right | 2.2 km || 
|-id=348 bgcolor=#E9E9E9
| 466348 ||  || — || February 13, 2011 || Mount Lemmon || Mount Lemmon Survey || — || align=right | 2.5 km || 
|-id=349 bgcolor=#E9E9E9
| 466349 ||  || — || December 14, 2010 || Mount Lemmon || Mount Lemmon Survey || — || align=right | 1.1 km || 
|-id=350 bgcolor=#d6d6d6
| 466350 ||  || — || March 26, 2010 || WISE || WISE || — || align=right | 3.7 km || 
|-id=351 bgcolor=#d6d6d6
| 466351 ||  || — || January 13, 2010 || Mount Lemmon || Mount Lemmon Survey || EOS || align=right | 2.8 km || 
|-id=352 bgcolor=#E9E9E9
| 466352 ||  || — || October 29, 2005 || Kitt Peak || Spacewatch || (5) || align=right data-sort-value="0.74" | 740 m || 
|-id=353 bgcolor=#E9E9E9
| 466353 ||  || — || September 1, 2005 || Kitt Peak || Spacewatch || — || align=right data-sort-value="0.72" | 720 m || 
|-id=354 bgcolor=#d6d6d6
| 466354 ||  || — || September 5, 2008 || Kitt Peak || Spacewatch || — || align=right | 2.8 km || 
|-id=355 bgcolor=#fefefe
| 466355 ||  || — || May 8, 2005 || Kitt Peak || Spacewatch || — || align=right data-sort-value="0.77" | 770 m || 
|-id=356 bgcolor=#d6d6d6
| 466356 ||  || — || September 14, 2007 || Mount Lemmon || Mount Lemmon Survey || TIR || align=right | 3.1 km || 
|-id=357 bgcolor=#E9E9E9
| 466357 ||  || — || March 9, 2011 || Mount Lemmon || Mount Lemmon Survey || — || align=right | 1.8 km || 
|-id=358 bgcolor=#E9E9E9
| 466358 ||  || — || September 30, 2009 || Mount Lemmon || Mount Lemmon Survey || — || align=right | 1.2 km || 
|-id=359 bgcolor=#E9E9E9
| 466359 ||  || — || November 25, 2009 || Kitt Peak || Spacewatch || — || align=right | 1.8 km || 
|-id=360 bgcolor=#fefefe
| 466360 ||  || — || February 24, 2008 || Mount Lemmon || Mount Lemmon Survey || — || align=right data-sort-value="0.73" | 730 m || 
|-id=361 bgcolor=#d6d6d6
| 466361 ||  || — || October 14, 1999 || Kitt Peak || Spacewatch || KOR || align=right | 1.4 km || 
|-id=362 bgcolor=#d6d6d6
| 466362 ||  || — || September 24, 2008 || Kitt Peak || Spacewatch || — || align=right | 2.3 km || 
|-id=363 bgcolor=#d6d6d6
| 466363 ||  || — || February 25, 2011 || Mount Lemmon || Mount Lemmon Survey || — || align=right | 3.5 km || 
|-id=364 bgcolor=#E9E9E9
| 466364 ||  || — || March 3, 2010 || WISE || WISE || — || align=right | 3.4 km || 
|-id=365 bgcolor=#d6d6d6
| 466365 ||  || — || March 4, 2005 || Mount Lemmon || Mount Lemmon Survey || — || align=right | 2.4 km || 
|-id=366 bgcolor=#fefefe
| 466366 ||  || — || March 8, 2005 || Mount Lemmon || Mount Lemmon Survey || — || align=right data-sort-value="0.67" | 670 m || 
|-id=367 bgcolor=#d6d6d6
| 466367 ||  || — || April 19, 2006 || Mount Lemmon || Mount Lemmon Survey || — || align=right | 2.9 km || 
|-id=368 bgcolor=#d6d6d6
| 466368 ||  || — || September 13, 2013 || Kitt Peak || Spacewatch || — || align=right | 2.7 km || 
|-id=369 bgcolor=#E9E9E9
| 466369 ||  || — || September 11, 2004 || Socorro || LINEAR || — || align=right | 1.4 km || 
|-id=370 bgcolor=#d6d6d6
| 466370 ||  || — || October 6, 2008 || Mount Lemmon || Mount Lemmon Survey || — || align=right | 3.2 km || 
|-id=371 bgcolor=#E9E9E9
| 466371 ||  || — || May 22, 2012 || Mount Lemmon || Mount Lemmon Survey || — || align=right | 2.1 km || 
|-id=372 bgcolor=#d6d6d6
| 466372 ||  || — || September 28, 2008 || Mount Lemmon || Mount Lemmon Survey || — || align=right | 2.4 km || 
|-id=373 bgcolor=#d6d6d6
| 466373 ||  || — || March 13, 2005 || Catalina || CSS || — || align=right | 3.5 km || 
|-id=374 bgcolor=#d6d6d6
| 466374 ||  || — || September 6, 2013 || Kitt Peak || Spacewatch ||  || align=right | 3.4 km || 
|-id=375 bgcolor=#E9E9E9
| 466375 ||  || — || April 30, 2008 || Mount Lemmon || Mount Lemmon Survey || — || align=right | 1.1 km || 
|-id=376 bgcolor=#d6d6d6
| 466376 ||  || — || September 23, 2008 || Kitt Peak || Spacewatch || EOS || align=right | 1.5 km || 
|-id=377 bgcolor=#E9E9E9
| 466377 ||  || — || September 30, 2009 || Mount Lemmon || Mount Lemmon Survey || — || align=right | 1.2 km || 
|-id=378 bgcolor=#d6d6d6
| 466378 ||  || — || February 18, 2010 || Kitt Peak || Spacewatch || — || align=right | 3.1 km || 
|-id=379 bgcolor=#fefefe
| 466379 ||  || — || March 6, 2008 || Mount Lemmon || Mount Lemmon Survey || — || align=right data-sort-value="0.89" | 890 m || 
|-id=380 bgcolor=#fefefe
| 466380 ||  || — || March 16, 2012 || Mount Lemmon || Mount Lemmon Survey || — || align=right data-sort-value="0.65" | 650 m || 
|-id=381 bgcolor=#fefefe
| 466381 ||  || — || August 16, 2009 || Catalina || CSS || — || align=right data-sort-value="0.71" | 710 m || 
|-id=382 bgcolor=#d6d6d6
| 466382 ||  || — || September 19, 2008 || Kitt Peak || Spacewatch || — || align=right | 3.1 km || 
|-id=383 bgcolor=#d6d6d6
| 466383 ||  || — || October 2, 2008 || Mount Lemmon || Mount Lemmon Survey || EOS || align=right | 2.7 km || 
|-id=384 bgcolor=#E9E9E9
| 466384 ||  || — || May 11, 2004 || Catalina || CSS || — || align=right | 1.4 km || 
|-id=385 bgcolor=#d6d6d6
| 466385 ||  || — || March 30, 2011 || Mount Lemmon || Mount Lemmon Survey || VER || align=right | 2.8 km || 
|-id=386 bgcolor=#d6d6d6
| 466386 ||  || — || April 12, 2011 || Mount Lemmon || Mount Lemmon Survey || — || align=right | 2.6 km || 
|-id=387 bgcolor=#d6d6d6
| 466387 ||  || — || September 13, 2007 || Mount Lemmon || Mount Lemmon Survey || — || align=right | 3.2 km || 
|-id=388 bgcolor=#E9E9E9
| 466388 ||  || — || August 30, 2009 || Kitt Peak || Spacewatch || — || align=right | 1.9 km || 
|-id=389 bgcolor=#d6d6d6
| 466389 ||  || — || March 26, 2011 || Kitt Peak || Spacewatch || — || align=right | 3.0 km || 
|-id=390 bgcolor=#d6d6d6
| 466390 ||  || — || October 26, 2008 || Kitt Peak || Spacewatch || — || align=right | 2.6 km || 
|-id=391 bgcolor=#d6d6d6
| 466391 ||  || — || April 2, 2011 || Kitt Peak || Spacewatch || — || align=right | 2.6 km || 
|-id=392 bgcolor=#d6d6d6
| 466392 ||  || — || October 8, 2008 || Mount Lemmon || Mount Lemmon Survey || — || align=right | 2.1 km || 
|-id=393 bgcolor=#E9E9E9
| 466393 ||  || — || November 10, 2005 || Mount Lemmon || Mount Lemmon Survey || — || align=right | 1.3 km || 
|-id=394 bgcolor=#E9E9E9
| 466394 ||  || — || September 21, 2009 || Kitt Peak || Spacewatch || EUN || align=right data-sort-value="0.98" | 980 m || 
|-id=395 bgcolor=#d6d6d6
| 466395 ||  || — || September 20, 2008 || Catalina || CSS || — || align=right | 2.5 km || 
|-id=396 bgcolor=#d6d6d6
| 466396 ||  || — || October 6, 2008 || Mount Lemmon || Mount Lemmon Survey || — || align=right | 2.5 km || 
|-id=397 bgcolor=#E9E9E9
| 466397 ||  || — || January 23, 2006 || Kitt Peak || Spacewatch || AGN || align=right | 1.2 km || 
|-id=398 bgcolor=#E9E9E9
| 466398 ||  || — || January 25, 2006 || Kitt Peak || Spacewatch || — || align=right | 2.0 km || 
|-id=399 bgcolor=#fefefe
| 466399 ||  || — || July 3, 2005 || Mount Lemmon || Mount Lemmon Survey || — || align=right data-sort-value="0.66" | 660 m || 
|-id=400 bgcolor=#d6d6d6
| 466400 ||  || — || September 2, 2013 || Mount Lemmon || Mount Lemmon Survey || — || align=right | 2.4 km || 
|}

466401–466500 

|-bgcolor=#fefefe
| 466401 ||  || — || April 24, 2001 || Kitt Peak || Spacewatch || — || align=right data-sort-value="0.85" | 850 m || 
|-id=402 bgcolor=#d6d6d6
| 466402 ||  || — || October 1, 2008 || Mount Lemmon || Mount Lemmon Survey || — || align=right | 2.0 km || 
|-id=403 bgcolor=#d6d6d6
| 466403 ||  || — || February 16, 2010 || Kitt Peak || Spacewatch || — || align=right | 2.2 km || 
|-id=404 bgcolor=#d6d6d6
| 466404 ||  || — || September 30, 2003 || Kitt Peak || Spacewatch || — || align=right | 2.1 km || 
|-id=405 bgcolor=#d6d6d6
| 466405 ||  || — || September 16, 2003 || Kitt Peak || Spacewatch || — || align=right | 2.2 km || 
|-id=406 bgcolor=#E9E9E9
| 466406 ||  || — || April 13, 2012 || Mount Lemmon || Mount Lemmon Survey || — || align=right | 1.3 km || 
|-id=407 bgcolor=#d6d6d6
| 466407 ||  || — || September 6, 2008 || Kitt Peak || Spacewatch || KOR || align=right | 1.2 km || 
|-id=408 bgcolor=#E9E9E9
| 466408 ||  || — || January 23, 2006 || Mount Lemmon || Mount Lemmon Survey || — || align=right | 1.9 km || 
|-id=409 bgcolor=#E9E9E9
| 466409 ||  || — || January 26, 2011 || Mount Lemmon || Mount Lemmon Survey || — || align=right | 1.3 km || 
|-id=410 bgcolor=#E9E9E9
| 466410 ||  || — || November 26, 2009 || Mount Lemmon || Mount Lemmon Survey || — || align=right | 1.6 km || 
|-id=411 bgcolor=#d6d6d6
| 466411 ||  || — || October 30, 2008 || Kitt Peak || Spacewatch || — || align=right | 2.7 km || 
|-id=412 bgcolor=#E9E9E9
| 466412 ||  || — || February 26, 2011 || Mount Lemmon || Mount Lemmon Survey || — || align=right | 1.9 km || 
|-id=413 bgcolor=#E9E9E9
| 466413 ||  || — || October 20, 1995 || Kitt Peak || Spacewatch || — || align=right | 2.1 km || 
|-id=414 bgcolor=#E9E9E9
| 466414 ||  || — || March 30, 2011 || Mount Lemmon || Mount Lemmon Survey || — || align=right | 2.3 km || 
|-id=415 bgcolor=#d6d6d6
| 466415 ||  || — || September 27, 2003 || Kitt Peak || Spacewatch || — || align=right | 2.7 km || 
|-id=416 bgcolor=#fefefe
| 466416 ||  || — || May 9, 2005 || Siding Spring || SSS || — || align=right | 1.0 km || 
|-id=417 bgcolor=#E9E9E9
| 466417 ||  || — || October 27, 2009 || Kitt Peak || Spacewatch || — || align=right | 1.2 km || 
|-id=418 bgcolor=#E9E9E9
| 466418 ||  || — || November 9, 2009 || Mount Lemmon || Mount Lemmon Survey || — || align=right | 2.5 km || 
|-id=419 bgcolor=#FA8072
| 466419 ||  || — || April 2, 2005 || Kitt Peak || Spacewatch || — || align=right data-sort-value="0.99" | 990 m || 
|-id=420 bgcolor=#E9E9E9
| 466420 ||  || — || July 30, 2008 || Mount Lemmon || Mount Lemmon Survey || — || align=right | 2.0 km || 
|-id=421 bgcolor=#d6d6d6
| 466421 ||  || — || December 2, 2008 || Kitt Peak || Spacewatch || EOS || align=right | 1.9 km || 
|-id=422 bgcolor=#d6d6d6
| 466422 ||  || — || September 23, 2008 || Mount Lemmon || Mount Lemmon Survey || EOS || align=right | 1.7 km || 
|-id=423 bgcolor=#d6d6d6
| 466423 ||  || — || September 3, 2013 || Kitt Peak || Spacewatch || Tj (2.95) || align=right | 3.5 km || 
|-id=424 bgcolor=#E9E9E9
| 466424 ||  || — || May 30, 2012 || Mount Lemmon || Mount Lemmon Survey || — || align=right | 2.2 km || 
|-id=425 bgcolor=#d6d6d6
| 466425 ||  || — || October 1, 2013 || Kitt Peak || Spacewatch || — || align=right | 2.7 km || 
|-id=426 bgcolor=#E9E9E9
| 466426 ||  || — || November 8, 2009 || Mount Lemmon || Mount Lemmon Survey || — || align=right data-sort-value="0.82" | 820 m || 
|-id=427 bgcolor=#d6d6d6
| 466427 ||  || — || January 8, 2010 || WISE || WISE || — || align=right | 3.3 km || 
|-id=428 bgcolor=#E9E9E9
| 466428 ||  || — || April 23, 2012 || Kitt Peak || Spacewatch || ADE || align=right | 1.5 km || 
|-id=429 bgcolor=#E9E9E9
| 466429 ||  || — || November 19, 2009 || Mount Lemmon || Mount Lemmon Survey || — || align=right | 1.5 km || 
|-id=430 bgcolor=#d6d6d6
| 466430 ||  || — || October 3, 2013 || Mount Lemmon || Mount Lemmon Survey || EOS || align=right | 1.7 km || 
|-id=431 bgcolor=#E9E9E9
| 466431 ||  || — || October 5, 2004 || Kitt Peak || Spacewatch || — || align=right | 2.2 km || 
|-id=432 bgcolor=#d6d6d6
| 466432 ||  || — || October 24, 2008 || Kitt Peak || Spacewatch || — || align=right | 2.2 km || 
|-id=433 bgcolor=#E9E9E9
| 466433 ||  || — || October 14, 2009 || Mount Lemmon || Mount Lemmon Survey || — || align=right | 1.4 km || 
|-id=434 bgcolor=#d6d6d6
| 466434 ||  || — || September 21, 2008 || Mount Lemmon || Mount Lemmon Survey || KOR || align=right | 1.3 km || 
|-id=435 bgcolor=#d6d6d6
| 466435 ||  || — || October 23, 1997 || Kitt Peak || Spacewatch || — || align=right | 3.3 km || 
|-id=436 bgcolor=#E9E9E9
| 466436 ||  || — || October 23, 2009 || Kitt Peak || Spacewatch || — || align=right data-sort-value="0.97" | 970 m || 
|-id=437 bgcolor=#d6d6d6
| 466437 ||  || — || October 24, 2008 || Kitt Peak || Spacewatch || — || align=right | 2.3 km || 
|-id=438 bgcolor=#d6d6d6
| 466438 ||  || — || November 7, 2008 || Mount Lemmon || Mount Lemmon Survey || THM || align=right | 2.1 km || 
|-id=439 bgcolor=#d6d6d6
| 466439 ||  || — || May 2, 2006 || Mount Lemmon || Mount Lemmon Survey || — || align=right | 2.8 km || 
|-id=440 bgcolor=#E9E9E9
| 466440 ||  || — || October 7, 2004 || Kitt Peak || Spacewatch || — || align=right | 2.4 km || 
|-id=441 bgcolor=#E9E9E9
| 466441 ||  || — || March 14, 2007 || Kitt Peak || Spacewatch || — || align=right | 1.7 km || 
|-id=442 bgcolor=#d6d6d6
| 466442 ||  || — || October 3, 2013 || Kitt Peak || Spacewatch || — || align=right | 2.7 km || 
|-id=443 bgcolor=#E9E9E9
| 466443 ||  || — || November 20, 2009 || Kitt Peak || Spacewatch || — || align=right | 1.8 km || 
|-id=444 bgcolor=#d6d6d6
| 466444 ||  || — || March 13, 2011 || Mount Lemmon || Mount Lemmon Survey || — || align=right | 2.3 km || 
|-id=445 bgcolor=#d6d6d6
| 466445 ||  || — || September 5, 2008 || Kitt Peak || Spacewatch || — || align=right | 2.2 km || 
|-id=446 bgcolor=#d6d6d6
| 466446 ||  || — || September 5, 2007 || Mount Lemmon || Mount Lemmon Survey ||  || align=right | 3.2 km || 
|-id=447 bgcolor=#E9E9E9
| 466447 ||  || — || April 19, 2007 || Kitt Peak || Spacewatch || — || align=right | 2.1 km || 
|-id=448 bgcolor=#d6d6d6
| 466448 ||  || — || September 5, 2008 || Kitt Peak || Spacewatch || BRA || align=right | 1.1 km || 
|-id=449 bgcolor=#d6d6d6
| 466449 ||  || — || April 2, 2011 || Kitt Peak || Spacewatch || — || align=right | 3.2 km || 
|-id=450 bgcolor=#d6d6d6
| 466450 ||  || — || September 15, 2007 || Kitt Peak || Spacewatch || — || align=right | 2.9 km || 
|-id=451 bgcolor=#d6d6d6
| 466451 ||  || — || September 4, 2007 || Mount Lemmon || Mount Lemmon Survey || HYG || align=right | 2.8 km || 
|-id=452 bgcolor=#d6d6d6
| 466452 ||  || — || April 13, 2011 || Kitt Peak || Spacewatch || — || align=right | 3.1 km || 
|-id=453 bgcolor=#d6d6d6
| 466453 ||  || — || September 11, 2007 || Mount Lemmon || Mount Lemmon Survey || — || align=right | 2.5 km || 
|-id=454 bgcolor=#d6d6d6
| 466454 ||  || — || December 4, 2008 || Kitt Peak || Spacewatch || — || align=right | 2.8 km || 
|-id=455 bgcolor=#d6d6d6
| 466455 ||  || — || May 15, 2010 || WISE || WISE || — || align=right | 2.9 km || 
|-id=456 bgcolor=#E9E9E9
| 466456 ||  || — || November 3, 2005 || Catalina || CSS || (5) || align=right data-sort-value="0.77" | 770 m || 
|-id=457 bgcolor=#d6d6d6
| 466457 ||  || — || August 29, 2006 || Kitt Peak || Spacewatch || 7:4 || align=right | 3.0 km || 
|-id=458 bgcolor=#d6d6d6
| 466458 ||  || — || October 10, 2007 || Mount Lemmon || Mount Lemmon Survey || — || align=right | 2.2 km || 
|-id=459 bgcolor=#d6d6d6
| 466459 ||  || — || September 12, 2007 || Mount Lemmon || Mount Lemmon Survey || — || align=right | 2.3 km || 
|-id=460 bgcolor=#d6d6d6
| 466460 ||  || — || October 3, 2013 || Kitt Peak || Spacewatch || — || align=right | 2.9 km || 
|-id=461 bgcolor=#E9E9E9
| 466461 ||  || — || November 25, 2009 || Kitt Peak || Spacewatch || — || align=right | 2.4 km || 
|-id=462 bgcolor=#d6d6d6
| 466462 ||  || — || April 30, 2006 || Kitt Peak || Spacewatch || EOS || align=right | 1.6 km || 
|-id=463 bgcolor=#d6d6d6
| 466463 ||  || — || May 9, 2011 || Mount Lemmon || Mount Lemmon Survey || — || align=right | 3.1 km || 
|-id=464 bgcolor=#d6d6d6
| 466464 ||  || — || January 8, 2010 || WISE || WISE || — || align=right | 3.8 km || 
|-id=465 bgcolor=#E9E9E9
| 466465 ||  || — || September 7, 2008 || Catalina || CSS || AGN || align=right | 1.2 km || 
|-id=466 bgcolor=#d6d6d6
| 466466 ||  || — || December 1, 2008 || Kitt Peak || Spacewatch || — || align=right | 2.5 km || 
|-id=467 bgcolor=#fefefe
| 466467 ||  || — || April 30, 2005 || Kitt Peak || Spacewatch || — || align=right data-sort-value="0.78" | 780 m || 
|-id=468 bgcolor=#d6d6d6
| 466468 ||  || — || September 6, 2013 || Kitt Peak || Spacewatch || — || align=right | 2.4 km || 
|-id=469 bgcolor=#d6d6d6
| 466469 ||  || — || September 25, 2013 || Catalina || CSS || — || align=right | 3.3 km || 
|-id=470 bgcolor=#E9E9E9
| 466470 ||  || — || April 14, 2007 || Kitt Peak || Spacewatch || — || align=right | 2.3 km || 
|-id=471 bgcolor=#E9E9E9
| 466471 ||  || — || September 21, 2009 || Mount Lemmon || Mount Lemmon Survey || MAR || align=right data-sort-value="0.93" | 930 m || 
|-id=472 bgcolor=#d6d6d6
| 466472 ||  || — || September 28, 2008 || Mount Lemmon || Mount Lemmon Survey || EOS || align=right | 1.8 km || 
|-id=473 bgcolor=#d6d6d6
| 466473 ||  || — || March 21, 2010 || Mount Lemmon || Mount Lemmon Survey || — || align=right | 3.1 km || 
|-id=474 bgcolor=#E9E9E9
| 466474 ||  || — || September 22, 2009 || Mount Lemmon || Mount Lemmon Survey || — || align=right data-sort-value="0.86" | 860 m || 
|-id=475 bgcolor=#d6d6d6
| 466475 ||  || — || April 4, 2005 || Mount Lemmon || Mount Lemmon Survey || — || align=right | 3.4 km || 
|-id=476 bgcolor=#d6d6d6
| 466476 ||  || — || February 24, 2006 || Kitt Peak || Spacewatch || KOR || align=right | 1.2 km || 
|-id=477 bgcolor=#d6d6d6
| 466477 ||  || — || June 16, 2012 || Mount Lemmon || Mount Lemmon Survey || HYG || align=right | 2.5 km || 
|-id=478 bgcolor=#E9E9E9
| 466478 ||  || — || October 6, 1999 || Socorro || LINEAR || — || align=right | 3.0 km || 
|-id=479 bgcolor=#E9E9E9
| 466479 ||  || — || September 7, 2000 || Socorro || LINEAR || — || align=right | 1.5 km || 
|-id=480 bgcolor=#d6d6d6
| 466480 ||  || — || November 19, 2008 || Mount Lemmon || Mount Lemmon Survey || — || align=right | 2.7 km || 
|-id=481 bgcolor=#d6d6d6
| 466481 ||  || — || September 13, 2013 || Mount Lemmon || Mount Lemmon Survey || — || align=right | 3.1 km || 
|-id=482 bgcolor=#d6d6d6
| 466482 ||  || — || September 5, 2007 || Catalina || CSS || — || align=right | 6.2 km || 
|-id=483 bgcolor=#d6d6d6
| 466483 ||  || — || September 14, 2013 || Mount Lemmon || Mount Lemmon Survey || — || align=right | 2.9 km || 
|-id=484 bgcolor=#E9E9E9
| 466484 ||  || — || October 26, 2013 || Catalina || CSS || — || align=right | 2.5 km || 
|-id=485 bgcolor=#d6d6d6
| 466485 ||  || — || October 15, 2013 || Kitt Peak || Spacewatch || HYG || align=right | 2.6 km || 
|-id=486 bgcolor=#d6d6d6
| 466486 ||  || — || November 1, 2008 || Catalina || CSS || — || align=right | 3.1 km || 
|-id=487 bgcolor=#d6d6d6
| 466487 ||  || — || October 16, 2007 || Mount Lemmon || Mount Lemmon Survey || — || align=right | 3.4 km || 
|-id=488 bgcolor=#d6d6d6
| 466488 ||  || — || October 25, 2008 || Kitt Peak || Spacewatch || — || align=right | 2.5 km || 
|-id=489 bgcolor=#d6d6d6
| 466489 ||  || — || May 22, 2011 || Mount Lemmon || Mount Lemmon Survey || — || align=right | 3.0 km || 
|-id=490 bgcolor=#d6d6d6
| 466490 ||  || — || July 20, 2012 || Siding Spring || SSS || — || align=right | 3.0 km || 
|-id=491 bgcolor=#E9E9E9
| 466491 ||  || — || February 7, 2002 || Kitt Peak || Spacewatch || — || align=right | 1.8 km || 
|-id=492 bgcolor=#d6d6d6
| 466492 ||  || — || October 11, 2007 || Kitt Peak || Spacewatch || — || align=right | 4.0 km || 
|-id=493 bgcolor=#E9E9E9
| 466493 ||  || — || October 1, 2008 || Catalina || CSS || — || align=right | 2.5 km || 
|-id=494 bgcolor=#d6d6d6
| 466494 ||  || — || September 14, 2007 || Mount Lemmon || Mount Lemmon Survey || — || align=right | 2.4 km || 
|-id=495 bgcolor=#d6d6d6
| 466495 ||  || — || October 9, 2007 || Kitt Peak || Spacewatch || VER || align=right | 2.7 km || 
|-id=496 bgcolor=#d6d6d6
| 466496 ||  || — || April 12, 2011 || Mount Lemmon || Mount Lemmon Survey || — || align=right | 3.0 km || 
|-id=497 bgcolor=#d6d6d6
| 466497 ||  || — || May 26, 2011 || Mount Lemmon || Mount Lemmon Survey || — || align=right | 3.3 km || 
|-id=498 bgcolor=#d6d6d6
| 466498 ||  || — || September 14, 2013 || Mount Lemmon || Mount Lemmon Survey || — || align=right | 3.5 km || 
|-id=499 bgcolor=#d6d6d6
| 466499 ||  || — || September 15, 2007 || Catalina || CSS || — || align=right | 3.8 km || 
|-id=500 bgcolor=#d6d6d6
| 466500 ||  || — || October 20, 2007 || Mount Lemmon || Mount Lemmon Survey || — || align=right | 4.1 km || 
|}

466501–466600 

|-bgcolor=#d6d6d6
| 466501 ||  || — || May 16, 2010 || WISE || WISE || — || align=right | 3.0 km || 
|-id=502 bgcolor=#d6d6d6
| 466502 ||  || — || November 28, 2013 || Mount Lemmon || Mount Lemmon Survey || URS || align=right | 4.1 km || 
|-id=503 bgcolor=#E9E9E9
| 466503 ||  || — || August 25, 2004 || Siding Spring || SSS || — || align=right | 2.8 km || 
|-id=504 bgcolor=#d6d6d6
| 466504 ||  || — || November 1, 2008 || Mount Lemmon || Mount Lemmon Survey || — || align=right | 3.3 km || 
|-id=505 bgcolor=#fefefe
| 466505 ||  || — || January 3, 2014 || Catalina || CSS || H || align=right data-sort-value="0.77" | 770 m || 
|-id=506 bgcolor=#E9E9E9
| 466506 ||  || — || October 16, 2007 || Mount Lemmon || Mount Lemmon Survey || GEF || align=right | 1.6 km || 
|-id=507 bgcolor=#FFC2E0
| 466507 ||  || — || March 25, 2014 || Mount Lemmon || Mount Lemmon Survey || ATEcritical || align=right data-sort-value="0.25" | 250 m || 
|-id=508 bgcolor=#FFC2E0
| 466508 ||  || — || April 8, 2014 || Catalina || CSS || APOPHA || align=right data-sort-value="0.66" | 660 m || 
|-id=509 bgcolor=#fefefe
| 466509 ||  || — || October 20, 2011 || Kitt Peak || Spacewatch || — || align=right data-sort-value="0.53" | 530 m || 
|-id=510 bgcolor=#fefefe
| 466510 ||  || — || February 22, 2009 || Kitt Peak || Spacewatch || — || align=right data-sort-value="0.63" | 630 m || 
|-id=511 bgcolor=#fefefe
| 466511 ||  || — || August 22, 2004 || Kitt Peak || Spacewatch || — || align=right data-sort-value="0.71" | 710 m || 
|-id=512 bgcolor=#fefefe
| 466512 ||  || — || October 11, 2007 || Mount Lemmon || Mount Lemmon Survey || — || align=right data-sort-value="0.68" | 680 m || 
|-id=513 bgcolor=#FA8072
| 466513 ||  || — || September 30, 2003 || Socorro || LINEAR || — || align=right data-sort-value="0.56" | 560 m || 
|-id=514 bgcolor=#fefefe
| 466514 ||  || — || June 2, 2014 || Mount Lemmon || Mount Lemmon Survey || — || align=right data-sort-value="0.82" | 820 m || 
|-id=515 bgcolor=#fefefe
| 466515 ||  || — || September 13, 2007 || Catalina || CSS || — || align=right data-sort-value="0.68" | 680 m || 
|-id=516 bgcolor=#d6d6d6
| 466516 ||  || — || January 31, 2006 || Kitt Peak || Spacewatch || — || align=right | 2.3 km || 
|-id=517 bgcolor=#fefefe
| 466517 ||  || — || October 9, 2007 || Mount Lemmon || Mount Lemmon Survey || — || align=right data-sort-value="0.67" | 670 m || 
|-id=518 bgcolor=#fefefe
| 466518 ||  || — || September 14, 2007 || Mount Lemmon || Mount Lemmon Survey || — || align=right data-sort-value="0.64" | 640 m || 
|-id=519 bgcolor=#E9E9E9
| 466519 ||  || — || November 16, 2006 || Mount Lemmon || Mount Lemmon Survey || — || align=right | 1.4 km || 
|-id=520 bgcolor=#fefefe
| 466520 ||  || — || November 4, 2004 || Kitt Peak || Spacewatch || — || align=right data-sort-value="0.66" | 660 m || 
|-id=521 bgcolor=#fefefe
| 466521 ||  || — || February 28, 2008 || Kitt Peak || Spacewatch || H || align=right data-sort-value="0.61" | 610 m || 
|-id=522 bgcolor=#fefefe
| 466522 ||  || — || September 30, 2003 || Kitt Peak || Spacewatch || — || align=right data-sort-value="0.74" | 740 m || 
|-id=523 bgcolor=#E9E9E9
| 466523 ||  || — || December 21, 2006 || Kitt Peak || Spacewatch || (5) || align=right data-sort-value="0.85" | 850 m || 
|-id=524 bgcolor=#fefefe
| 466524 ||  || — || October 13, 2007 || Mount Lemmon || Mount Lemmon Survey || — || align=right data-sort-value="0.67" | 670 m || 
|-id=525 bgcolor=#fefefe
| 466525 ||  || — || March 5, 2008 || Mount Lemmon || Mount Lemmon Survey || H || align=right data-sort-value="0.73" | 730 m || 
|-id=526 bgcolor=#E9E9E9
| 466526 ||  || — || March 13, 2012 || Kitt Peak || Spacewatch || MAR || align=right | 1.2 km || 
|-id=527 bgcolor=#fefefe
| 466527 ||  || — || November 13, 2007 || Kitt Peak || Spacewatch || — || align=right data-sort-value="0.76" | 760 m || 
|-id=528 bgcolor=#fefefe
| 466528 ||  || — || October 25, 2008 || Kitt Peak || Spacewatch || — || align=right data-sort-value="0.56" | 560 m || 
|-id=529 bgcolor=#FA8072
| 466529 ||  || — || October 22, 2009 || Mount Lemmon || Mount Lemmon Survey || H || align=right data-sort-value="0.71" | 710 m || 
|-id=530 bgcolor=#E9E9E9
| 466530 ||  || — || December 11, 2010 || Siding Spring || SSS || — || align=right | 1.8 km || 
|-id=531 bgcolor=#E9E9E9
| 466531 ||  || — || January 29, 2007 || Kitt Peak || Spacewatch || HOF || align=right | 2.8 km || 
|-id=532 bgcolor=#fefefe
| 466532 ||  || — || November 8, 2007 || Socorro || LINEAR || — || align=right data-sort-value="0.77" | 770 m || 
|-id=533 bgcolor=#fefefe
| 466533 ||  || — || February 1, 2009 || Kitt Peak || Spacewatch || — || align=right data-sort-value="0.66" | 660 m || 
|-id=534 bgcolor=#fefefe
| 466534 ||  || — || December 1, 2003 || Kitt Peak || Spacewatch || NYS || align=right data-sort-value="0.52" | 520 m || 
|-id=535 bgcolor=#d6d6d6
| 466535 ||  || — || February 27, 2006 || Kitt Peak || Spacewatch || — || align=right | 2.0 km || 
|-id=536 bgcolor=#fefefe
| 466536 ||  || — || October 8, 2007 || Mount Lemmon || Mount Lemmon Survey || — || align=right data-sort-value="0.57" | 570 m || 
|-id=537 bgcolor=#fefefe
| 466537 ||  || — || October 18, 2011 || Mount Lemmon || Mount Lemmon Survey || — || align=right data-sort-value="0.60" | 600 m || 
|-id=538 bgcolor=#fefefe
| 466538 ||  || — || March 10, 2003 || Kitt Peak || Spacewatch || — || align=right data-sort-value="0.59" | 590 m || 
|-id=539 bgcolor=#fefefe
| 466539 ||  || — || October 8, 2004 || Kitt Peak || Spacewatch || — || align=right data-sort-value="0.64" | 640 m || 
|-id=540 bgcolor=#fefefe
| 466540 ||  || — || September 27, 2006 || Catalina || CSS || H || align=right data-sort-value="0.54" | 540 m || 
|-id=541 bgcolor=#d6d6d6
| 466541 ||  || — || November 17, 2009 || Catalina || CSS || — || align=right | 3.2 km || 
|-id=542 bgcolor=#fefefe
| 466542 ||  || — || March 27, 2008 || Mount Lemmon || Mount Lemmon Survey || H || align=right data-sort-value="0.41" | 410 m || 
|-id=543 bgcolor=#fefefe
| 466543 ||  || — || February 3, 2009 || Mount Lemmon || Mount Lemmon Survey || V || align=right data-sort-value="0.52" | 520 m || 
|-id=544 bgcolor=#d6d6d6
| 466544 ||  || — || February 1, 2006 || Mount Lemmon || Mount Lemmon Survey || — || align=right | 3.9 km || 
|-id=545 bgcolor=#E9E9E9
| 466545 ||  || — || October 3, 2006 || Mount Lemmon || Mount Lemmon Survey || (5) || align=right data-sort-value="0.66" | 660 m || 
|-id=546 bgcolor=#fefefe
| 466546 ||  || — || September 14, 1994 || Kitt Peak || Spacewatch || — || align=right data-sort-value="0.58" | 580 m || 
|-id=547 bgcolor=#fefefe
| 466547 ||  || — || February 21, 1995 || Kitt Peak || Spacewatch || — || align=right data-sort-value="0.74" | 740 m || 
|-id=548 bgcolor=#d6d6d6
| 466548 ||  || — || May 2, 2010 || WISE || WISE || — || align=right | 2.8 km || 
|-id=549 bgcolor=#d6d6d6
| 466549 ||  || — || March 2, 2010 || WISE || WISE || — || align=right | 1.9 km || 
|-id=550 bgcolor=#fefefe
| 466550 ||  || — || August 12, 2007 || XuYi || PMO NEO || — || align=right data-sort-value="0.73" | 730 m || 
|-id=551 bgcolor=#fefefe
| 466551 ||  || — || October 10, 2004 || Kitt Peak || Spacewatch || — || align=right data-sort-value="0.57" | 570 m || 
|-id=552 bgcolor=#E9E9E9
| 466552 ||  || — || September 16, 2009 || Mount Lemmon || Mount Lemmon Survey || DOR || align=right | 2.2 km || 
|-id=553 bgcolor=#E9E9E9
| 466553 ||  || — || November 18, 2006 || Kitt Peak || Spacewatch || — || align=right data-sort-value="0.76" | 760 m || 
|-id=554 bgcolor=#fefefe
| 466554 ||  || — || June 15, 2010 || Mount Lemmon || Mount Lemmon Survey || — || align=right data-sort-value="0.88" | 880 m || 
|-id=555 bgcolor=#E9E9E9
| 466555 ||  || — || October 28, 2010 || Mount Lemmon || Mount Lemmon Survey || — || align=right | 1.2 km || 
|-id=556 bgcolor=#fefefe
| 466556 ||  || — || November 3, 2004 || Kitt Peak || Spacewatch || — || align=right data-sort-value="0.75" | 750 m || 
|-id=557 bgcolor=#fefefe
| 466557 ||  || — || September 17, 2003 || Kitt Peak || Spacewatch || — || align=right data-sort-value="0.64" | 640 m || 
|-id=558 bgcolor=#fefefe
| 466558 ||  || — || September 19, 1998 || Kitt Peak || Spacewatch || — || align=right data-sort-value="0.66" | 660 m || 
|-id=559 bgcolor=#fefefe
| 466559 ||  || — || October 21, 2003 || Kitt Peak || Spacewatch || (5026) || align=right data-sort-value="0.63" | 630 m || 
|-id=560 bgcolor=#d6d6d6
| 466560 ||  || — || September 18, 2003 || Kitt Peak || Spacewatch || EOS || align=right | 2.0 km || 
|-id=561 bgcolor=#fefefe
| 466561 ||  || — || September 16, 2010 || Mount Lemmon || Mount Lemmon Survey || — || align=right data-sort-value="0.85" | 850 m || 
|-id=562 bgcolor=#E9E9E9
| 466562 ||  || — || February 26, 2007 || Mount Lemmon || Mount Lemmon Survey ||  || align=right | 2.3 km || 
|-id=563 bgcolor=#fefefe
| 466563 ||  || — || February 3, 2008 || Mount Lemmon || Mount Lemmon Survey || — || align=right data-sort-value="0.79" | 790 m || 
|-id=564 bgcolor=#E9E9E9
| 466564 ||  || — || April 4, 2008 || Catalina || CSS || — || align=right | 1.0 km || 
|-id=565 bgcolor=#E9E9E9
| 466565 ||  || — || January 25, 2007 || Kitt Peak || Spacewatch || — || align=right | 1.2 km || 
|-id=566 bgcolor=#E9E9E9
| 466566 ||  || — || January 29, 2007 || Kitt Peak || Spacewatch || — || align=right | 2.2 km || 
|-id=567 bgcolor=#E9E9E9
| 466567 ||  || — || April 1, 2012 || Mount Lemmon || Mount Lemmon Survey || — || align=right | 1.4 km || 
|-id=568 bgcolor=#fefefe
| 466568 ||  || — || November 18, 2003 || Kitt Peak || Spacewatch || — || align=right | 2.5 km || 
|-id=569 bgcolor=#d6d6d6
| 466569 ||  || — || January 12, 2010 || Catalina || CSS || — || align=right | 3.5 km || 
|-id=570 bgcolor=#E9E9E9
| 466570 ||  || — || September 13, 2005 || Kitt Peak || Spacewatch || — || align=right | 1.3 km || 
|-id=571 bgcolor=#E9E9E9
| 466571 ||  || — || October 28, 2006 || Kitt Peak || Spacewatch || — || align=right data-sort-value="0.77" | 770 m || 
|-id=572 bgcolor=#d6d6d6
| 466572 ||  || — || March 13, 2010 || WISE || WISE || — || align=right | 3.0 km || 
|-id=573 bgcolor=#d6d6d6
| 466573 ||  || — || October 18, 2003 || Anderson Mesa || LONEOS || — || align=right | 2.4 km || 
|-id=574 bgcolor=#E9E9E9
| 466574 ||  || — || October 27, 2005 || Anderson Mesa || LONEOS || — || align=right | 2.0 km || 
|-id=575 bgcolor=#d6d6d6
| 466575 ||  || — || November 19, 2003 || Anderson Mesa || LONEOS || — || align=right | 4.2 km || 
|-id=576 bgcolor=#fefefe
| 466576 ||  || — || May 10, 2005 || Kitt Peak || Spacewatch || V || align=right data-sort-value="0.70" | 700 m || 
|-id=577 bgcolor=#fefefe
| 466577 ||  || — || October 23, 1998 || Kitt Peak || Spacewatch || — || align=right data-sort-value="0.52" | 520 m || 
|-id=578 bgcolor=#E9E9E9
| 466578 ||  || — || January 27, 2011 || Kitt Peak || Spacewatch || HOF || align=right | 2.3 km || 
|-id=579 bgcolor=#fefefe
| 466579 ||  || — || September 26, 2007 || Mount Lemmon || Mount Lemmon Survey || V || align=right data-sort-value="0.58" | 580 m || 
|-id=580 bgcolor=#fefefe
| 466580 ||  || — || October 5, 2004 || Kitt Peak || Spacewatch || — || align=right data-sort-value="0.68" | 680 m || 
|-id=581 bgcolor=#fefefe
| 466581 ||  || — || October 11, 2007 || Mount Lemmon || Mount Lemmon Survey || — || align=right data-sort-value="0.71" | 710 m || 
|-id=582 bgcolor=#E9E9E9
| 466582 ||  || — || January 2, 2011 || Mount Lemmon || Mount Lemmon Survey || — || align=right | 1.3 km || 
|-id=583 bgcolor=#d6d6d6
| 466583 ||  || — || November 19, 2009 || Mount Lemmon || Mount Lemmon Survey || — || align=right | 1.9 km || 
|-id=584 bgcolor=#fefefe
| 466584 ||  || — || December 19, 2007 || Mount Lemmon || Mount Lemmon Survey || — || align=right data-sort-value="0.72" | 720 m || 
|-id=585 bgcolor=#fefefe
| 466585 ||  || — || February 10, 2008 || Mount Lemmon || Mount Lemmon Survey || — || align=right data-sort-value="0.84" | 840 m || 
|-id=586 bgcolor=#fefefe
| 466586 ||  || — || October 10, 2007 || Kitt Peak || Spacewatch || — || align=right data-sort-value="0.68" | 680 m || 
|-id=587 bgcolor=#d6d6d6
| 466587 ||  || — || March 3, 2005 || Kitt Peak || Spacewatch || — || align=right | 3.0 km || 
|-id=588 bgcolor=#fefefe
| 466588 ||  || — || February 1, 2005 || Kitt Peak || Spacewatch || — || align=right data-sort-value="0.75" | 750 m || 
|-id=589 bgcolor=#E9E9E9
| 466589 ||  || — || April 13, 2012 || Mount Lemmon || Mount Lemmon Survey || — || align=right | 2.3 km || 
|-id=590 bgcolor=#E9E9E9
| 466590 ||  || — || December 29, 2005 || Socorro || LINEAR || DOR || align=right | 2.6 km || 
|-id=591 bgcolor=#E9E9E9
| 466591 ||  || — || December 3, 2010 || Mount Lemmon || Mount Lemmon Survey || — || align=right | 2.1 km || 
|-id=592 bgcolor=#fefefe
| 466592 ||  || — || January 3, 2000 || Kitt Peak || Spacewatch || — || align=right data-sort-value="0.99" | 990 m || 
|-id=593 bgcolor=#fefefe
| 466593 ||  || — || December 18, 2003 || Socorro || LINEAR || — || align=right data-sort-value="0.87" | 870 m || 
|-id=594 bgcolor=#d6d6d6
| 466594 ||  || — || September 17, 2003 || Kitt Peak || Spacewatch || — || align=right | 2.0 km || 
|-id=595 bgcolor=#E9E9E9
| 466595 ||  || — || June 11, 2008 || Kitt Peak || Spacewatch || — || align=right | 1.4 km || 
|-id=596 bgcolor=#fefefe
| 466596 ||  || — || February 9, 2008 || Catalina || CSS || — || align=right data-sort-value="0.78" | 780 m || 
|-id=597 bgcolor=#fefefe
| 466597 ||  || — || November 5, 2007 || Kitt Peak || Spacewatch || — || align=right data-sort-value="0.74" | 740 m || 
|-id=598 bgcolor=#fefefe
| 466598 ||  || — || March 29, 2009 || Mount Lemmon || Mount Lemmon Survey || — || align=right data-sort-value="0.64" | 640 m || 
|-id=599 bgcolor=#d6d6d6
| 466599 ||  || — || April 30, 2006 || Kitt Peak || Spacewatch || — || align=right | 4.1 km || 
|-id=600 bgcolor=#E9E9E9
| 466600 ||  || — || October 31, 2006 || Mount Lemmon || Mount Lemmon Survey || — || align=right data-sort-value="0.95" | 950 m || 
|}

466601–466700 

|-bgcolor=#fefefe
| 466601 ||  || — || September 6, 2004 || Siding Spring || SSS || — || align=right data-sort-value="0.69" | 690 m || 
|-id=602 bgcolor=#fefefe
| 466602 ||  || — || April 5, 2005 || Mount Lemmon || Mount Lemmon Survey || H || align=right data-sort-value="0.65" | 650 m || 
|-id=603 bgcolor=#E9E9E9
| 466603 ||  || — || December 14, 2010 || Mount Lemmon || Mount Lemmon Survey || RAF || align=right | 1.1 km || 
|-id=604 bgcolor=#E9E9E9
| 466604 ||  || — || December 14, 2010 || Mount Lemmon || Mount Lemmon Survey || (5) || align=right data-sort-value="0.84" | 840 m || 
|-id=605 bgcolor=#E9E9E9
| 466605 ||  || — || January 24, 2007 || Kitt Peak || Spacewatch || — || align=right | 1.3 km || 
|-id=606 bgcolor=#fefefe
| 466606 ||  || — || December 14, 2007 || Mount Lemmon || Mount Lemmon Survey || — || align=right data-sort-value="0.75" | 750 m || 
|-id=607 bgcolor=#fefefe
| 466607 ||  || — || October 18, 2010 || Kitt Peak || Spacewatch || — || align=right data-sort-value="0.76" | 760 m || 
|-id=608 bgcolor=#d6d6d6
| 466608 ||  || — || October 27, 2008 || Kitt Peak || Spacewatch || Tj (2.99) || align=right | 3.1 km || 
|-id=609 bgcolor=#d6d6d6
| 466609 ||  || — || January 16, 2005 || Socorro || LINEAR || — || align=right | 2.7 km || 
|-id=610 bgcolor=#E9E9E9
| 466610 ||  || — || November 13, 2006 || Catalina || CSS || — || align=right | 1.5 km || 
|-id=611 bgcolor=#d6d6d6
| 466611 ||  || — || September 5, 2008 || Kitt Peak || Spacewatch || — || align=right | 3.4 km || 
|-id=612 bgcolor=#fefefe
| 466612 ||  || — || September 11, 2010 || Kitt Peak || Spacewatch || — || align=right data-sort-value="0.94" | 940 m || 
|-id=613 bgcolor=#d6d6d6
| 466613 ||  || — || October 19, 2003 || Kitt Peak || Spacewatch || — || align=right | 2.8 km || 
|-id=614 bgcolor=#fefefe
| 466614 ||  || — || October 19, 1999 || Kitt Peak || Spacewatch || NYS || align=right data-sort-value="0.72" | 720 m || 
|-id=615 bgcolor=#fefefe
| 466615 ||  || — || March 10, 2008 || Mount Lemmon || Mount Lemmon Survey || — || align=right data-sort-value="0.84" | 840 m || 
|-id=616 bgcolor=#fefefe
| 466616 ||  || — || November 18, 2008 || Kitt Peak || Spacewatch || — || align=right data-sort-value="0.89" | 890 m || 
|-id=617 bgcolor=#d6d6d6
| 466617 ||  || — || March 6, 2010 || WISE || WISE || — || align=right | 1.8 km || 
|-id=618 bgcolor=#fefefe
| 466618 ||  || — || November 7, 2007 || Kitt Peak || Spacewatch || — || align=right data-sort-value="0.72" | 720 m || 
|-id=619 bgcolor=#E9E9E9
| 466619 ||  || — || December 15, 2006 || Kitt Peak || Spacewatch || — || align=right data-sort-value="0.87" | 870 m || 
|-id=620 bgcolor=#fefefe
| 466620 ||  || — || January 10, 2008 || Mount Lemmon || Mount Lemmon Survey || MAS || align=right data-sort-value="0.81" | 810 m || 
|-id=621 bgcolor=#E9E9E9
| 466621 ||  || — || March 16, 2007 || Kitt Peak || Spacewatch || AGN || align=right | 1.4 km || 
|-id=622 bgcolor=#E9E9E9
| 466622 ||  || — || October 1, 2005 || Kitt Peak || Spacewatch || — || align=right | 1.2 km || 
|-id=623 bgcolor=#d6d6d6
| 466623 ||  || — || April 19, 2010 || WISE || WISE || — || align=right | 2.6 km || 
|-id=624 bgcolor=#fefefe
| 466624 ||  || — || September 10, 2007 || Kitt Peak || Spacewatch || — || align=right data-sort-value="0.62" | 620 m || 
|-id=625 bgcolor=#fefefe
| 466625 ||  || — || November 17, 2006 || Catalina || CSS || H || align=right data-sort-value="0.88" | 880 m || 
|-id=626 bgcolor=#d6d6d6
| 466626 ||  || — || January 16, 2005 || Socorro || LINEAR || — || align=right | 3.2 km || 
|-id=627 bgcolor=#E9E9E9
| 466627 ||  || — || October 4, 1997 || Kitt Peak || Spacewatch || — || align=right | 1.5 km || 
|-id=628 bgcolor=#fefefe
| 466628 ||  || — || October 10, 2010 || Kitt Peak || Spacewatch || — || align=right data-sort-value="0.74" | 740 m || 
|-id=629 bgcolor=#fefefe
| 466629 ||  || — || January 15, 2008 || Kitt Peak || Spacewatch || — || align=right data-sort-value="0.71" | 710 m || 
|-id=630 bgcolor=#d6d6d6
| 466630 ||  || — || February 10, 2010 || Kitt Peak || Spacewatch || 7:4 || align=right | 2.6 km || 
|-id=631 bgcolor=#d6d6d6
| 466631 ||  || — || December 16, 2009 || Mount Lemmon || Mount Lemmon Survey || — || align=right | 2.3 km || 
|-id=632 bgcolor=#fefefe
| 466632 ||  || — || September 9, 2007 || Kitt Peak || Spacewatch || — || align=right data-sort-value="0.64" | 640 m || 
|-id=633 bgcolor=#E9E9E9
| 466633 ||  || — || December 21, 2006 || Kitt Peak || Spacewatch || — || align=right | 1.0 km || 
|-id=634 bgcolor=#fefefe
| 466634 ||  || — || December 4, 1996 || Kitt Peak || Spacewatch || V || align=right data-sort-value="0.57" | 570 m || 
|-id=635 bgcolor=#d6d6d6
| 466635 ||  || — || September 28, 2003 || Kitt Peak || Spacewatch || — || align=right | 2.9 km || 
|-id=636 bgcolor=#fefefe
| 466636 ||  || — || November 30, 2003 || Kitt Peak || Spacewatch || CLA || align=right | 1.2 km || 
|-id=637 bgcolor=#d6d6d6
| 466637 ||  || — || November 8, 2009 || Kitt Peak || Spacewatch || — || align=right | 2.0 km || 
|-id=638 bgcolor=#fefefe
| 466638 ||  || — || December 14, 2003 || Kitt Peak || Spacewatch || — || align=right data-sort-value="0.72" | 720 m || 
|-id=639 bgcolor=#E9E9E9
| 466639 ||  || — || October 27, 2005 || Kitt Peak || Spacewatch || — || align=right | 1.5 km || 
|-id=640 bgcolor=#d6d6d6
| 466640 ||  || — || February 1, 2006 || Kitt Peak || Spacewatch || KOR || align=right | 1.3 km || 
|-id=641 bgcolor=#fefefe
| 466641 ||  || — || December 30, 2007 || Mount Lemmon || Mount Lemmon Survey || — || align=right data-sort-value="0.92" | 920 m || 
|-id=642 bgcolor=#d6d6d6
| 466642 ||  || — || October 3, 2003 || Kitt Peak || Spacewatch || — || align=right | 2.7 km || 
|-id=643 bgcolor=#fefefe
| 466643 ||  || — || December 30, 2008 || Kitt Peak || Spacewatch || — || align=right data-sort-value="0.57" | 570 m || 
|-id=644 bgcolor=#fefefe
| 466644 ||  || — || October 14, 2007 || Mount Lemmon || Mount Lemmon Survey || — || align=right data-sort-value="0.72" | 720 m || 
|-id=645 bgcolor=#d6d6d6
| 466645 ||  || — || December 1, 2003 || Kitt Peak || Spacewatch || — || align=right | 2.1 km || 
|-id=646 bgcolor=#d6d6d6
| 466646 ||  || — || September 22, 2008 || Kitt Peak || Spacewatch || — || align=right | 2.8 km || 
|-id=647 bgcolor=#fefefe
| 466647 ||  || — || March 31, 2009 || Mount Lemmon || Mount Lemmon Survey || — || align=right data-sort-value="0.88" | 880 m || 
|-id=648 bgcolor=#fefefe
| 466648 ||  || — || August 13, 2007 || XuYi || PMO NEO || — || align=right data-sort-value="0.75" | 750 m || 
|-id=649 bgcolor=#E9E9E9
| 466649 ||  || — || December 13, 2006 || Mount Lemmon || Mount Lemmon Survey || (5) || align=right data-sort-value="0.75" | 750 m || 
|-id=650 bgcolor=#fefefe
| 466650 ||  || — || August 10, 2007 || Kitt Peak || Spacewatch || — || align=right data-sort-value="0.62" | 620 m || 
|-id=651 bgcolor=#fefefe
| 466651 ||  || — || January 12, 1996 || Kitt Peak || Spacewatch || — || align=right data-sort-value="0.78" | 780 m || 
|-id=652 bgcolor=#fefefe
| 466652 ||  || — || December 8, 1999 || Kitt Peak || Spacewatch || — || align=right | 1.1 km || 
|-id=653 bgcolor=#fefefe
| 466653 ||  || — || August 8, 2004 || Socorro || LINEAR || — || align=right data-sort-value="0.83" | 830 m || 
|-id=654 bgcolor=#E9E9E9
| 466654 ||  || — || November 6, 2010 || Mount Lemmon || Mount Lemmon Survey || — || align=right data-sort-value="0.92" | 920 m || 
|-id=655 bgcolor=#E9E9E9
| 466655 ||  || — || April 6, 2008 || Kitt Peak || Spacewatch || — || align=right data-sort-value="0.62" | 620 m || 
|-id=656 bgcolor=#fefefe
| 466656 ||  || — || December 17, 2007 || Mount Lemmon || Mount Lemmon Survey || V || align=right data-sort-value="0.61" | 610 m || 
|-id=657 bgcolor=#fefefe
| 466657 ||  || — || December 15, 2007 || Kitt Peak || Spacewatch || — || align=right data-sort-value="0.63" | 630 m || 
|-id=658 bgcolor=#d6d6d6
| 466658 ||  || — || October 14, 1998 || Kitt Peak || Spacewatch || — || align=right | 3.2 km || 
|-id=659 bgcolor=#E9E9E9
| 466659 ||  || — || October 14, 2010 || Mount Lemmon || Mount Lemmon Survey || — || align=right data-sort-value="0.83" | 830 m || 
|-id=660 bgcolor=#fefefe
| 466660 ||  || — || April 15, 2013 || Mount Lemmon || Mount Lemmon Survey || — || align=right data-sort-value="0.64" | 640 m || 
|-id=661 bgcolor=#d6d6d6
| 466661 ||  || — || September 6, 2008 || Mount Lemmon || Mount Lemmon Survey || — || align=right | 2.6 km || 
|-id=662 bgcolor=#E9E9E9
| 466662 ||  || — || November 13, 2006 || Kitt Peak || Spacewatch || — || align=right data-sort-value="0.81" | 810 m || 
|-id=663 bgcolor=#fefefe
| 466663 ||  || — || January 3, 2012 || Mount Lemmon || Mount Lemmon Survey || — || align=right data-sort-value="0.99" | 990 m || 
|-id=664 bgcolor=#E9E9E9
| 466664 ||  || — || February 23, 2007 || Mount Lemmon || Mount Lemmon Survey || — || align=right | 1.3 km || 
|-id=665 bgcolor=#E9E9E9
| 466665 ||  || — || November 27, 2010 || Mount Lemmon || Mount Lemmon Survey || — || align=right data-sort-value="0.79" | 790 m || 
|-id=666 bgcolor=#d6d6d6
| 466666 ||  || — || October 18, 2003 || Kitt Peak || Spacewatch || EOS || align=right | 1.4 km || 
|-id=667 bgcolor=#E9E9E9
| 466667 ||  || — || November 11, 2006 || Mount Lemmon || Mount Lemmon Survey || — || align=right | 1.2 km || 
|-id=668 bgcolor=#d6d6d6
| 466668 ||  || — || January 13, 2010 || Catalina || CSS || — || align=right | 2.9 km || 
|-id=669 bgcolor=#E9E9E9
| 466669 ||  || — || January 30, 2011 || Kitt Peak || Spacewatch || — || align=right | 1.8 km || 
|-id=670 bgcolor=#d6d6d6
| 466670 ||  || — || January 11, 2010 || Kitt Peak || Spacewatch || — || align=right | 3.1 km || 
|-id=671 bgcolor=#E9E9E9
| 466671 ||  || — || June 16, 2004 || Kitt Peak || Spacewatch || — || align=right | 2.4 km || 
|-id=672 bgcolor=#E9E9E9
| 466672 ||  || — || September 29, 2005 || Mount Lemmon || Mount Lemmon Survey || — || align=right | 1.4 km || 
|-id=673 bgcolor=#fefefe
| 466673 ||  || — || October 23, 2003 || Kitt Peak || Spacewatch || V || align=right data-sort-value="0.55" | 550 m || 
|-id=674 bgcolor=#d6d6d6
| 466674 ||  || — || April 10, 2005 || Mount Lemmon || Mount Lemmon Survey || — || align=right | 2.8 km || 
|-id=675 bgcolor=#E9E9E9
| 466675 ||  || — || November 26, 1997 || Socorro || LINEAR || — || align=right | 2.0 km || 
|-id=676 bgcolor=#E9E9E9
| 466676 ||  || — || December 4, 2005 || Kitt Peak || Spacewatch || — || align=right | 1.8 km || 
|-id=677 bgcolor=#fefefe
| 466677 ||  || — || September 25, 2006 || Kitt Peak || Spacewatch || — || align=right data-sort-value="0.98" | 980 m || 
|-id=678 bgcolor=#d6d6d6
| 466678 ||  || — || January 19, 2005 || Kitt Peak || Spacewatch || — || align=right | 2.2 km || 
|-id=679 bgcolor=#E9E9E9
| 466679 ||  || — || September 18, 2009 || Kitt Peak || Spacewatch || — || align=right | 2.1 km || 
|-id=680 bgcolor=#fefefe
| 466680 ||  || — || January 20, 2009 || Mount Lemmon || Mount Lemmon Survey || — || align=right data-sort-value="0.68" | 680 m || 
|-id=681 bgcolor=#E9E9E9
| 466681 ||  || — || May 26, 2003 || Kitt Peak || Spacewatch || ADE || align=right | 1.8 km || 
|-id=682 bgcolor=#E9E9E9
| 466682 ||  || — || November 8, 2010 || Kitt Peak || Spacewatch || — || align=right | 1.2 km || 
|-id=683 bgcolor=#fefefe
| 466683 ||  || — || May 10, 2005 || Kitt Peak || Spacewatch || — || align=right data-sort-value="0.88" | 880 m || 
|-id=684 bgcolor=#E9E9E9
| 466684 ||  || — || December 13, 2010 || Kitt Peak || Spacewatch || — || align=right | 1.2 km || 
|-id=685 bgcolor=#E9E9E9
| 466685 ||  || — || October 25, 2005 || Kitt Peak || Spacewatch || WIT || align=right data-sort-value="0.70" | 700 m || 
|-id=686 bgcolor=#E9E9E9
| 466686 ||  || — || September 15, 2009 || Kitt Peak || Spacewatch || HOF || align=right | 2.2 km || 
|-id=687 bgcolor=#d6d6d6
| 466687 ||  || — || June 14, 2007 || Kitt Peak || Spacewatch || — || align=right | 3.3 km || 
|-id=688 bgcolor=#d6d6d6
| 466688 ||  || — || November 19, 2009 || Mount Lemmon || Mount Lemmon Survey || — || align=right | 2.4 km || 
|-id=689 bgcolor=#d6d6d6
| 466689 ||  || — || January 15, 2005 || Kitt Peak || Spacewatch || — || align=right | 2.2 km || 
|-id=690 bgcolor=#E9E9E9
| 466690 ||  || — || December 5, 2005 || Mount Lemmon || Mount Lemmon Survey || HOF || align=right | 2.5 km || 
|-id=691 bgcolor=#E9E9E9
| 466691 ||  || — || February 8, 2007 || Mount Lemmon || Mount Lemmon Survey || — || align=right | 1.2 km || 
|-id=692 bgcolor=#E9E9E9
| 466692 ||  || — || September 26, 2005 || Kitt Peak || Spacewatch || — || align=right | 1.4 km || 
|-id=693 bgcolor=#fefefe
| 466693 ||  || — || January 18, 2009 || Mount Lemmon || Mount Lemmon Survey || — || align=right data-sort-value="0.71" | 710 m || 
|-id=694 bgcolor=#E9E9E9
| 466694 ||  || — || November 20, 2006 || Mount Lemmon || Mount Lemmon Survey || (5) || align=right data-sort-value="0.67" | 670 m || 
|-id=695 bgcolor=#fefefe
| 466695 ||  || — || January 15, 2008 || Kitt Peak || Spacewatch || — || align=right data-sort-value="0.78" | 780 m || 
|-id=696 bgcolor=#d6d6d6
| 466696 ||  || — || October 25, 2013 || Mount Lemmon || Mount Lemmon Survey || — || align=right | 3.1 km || 
|-id=697 bgcolor=#fefefe
| 466697 ||  || — || March 5, 2008 || Mount Lemmon || Mount Lemmon Survey || NYS || align=right data-sort-value="0.62" | 620 m || 
|-id=698 bgcolor=#d6d6d6
| 466698 ||  || — || October 25, 2008 || Mount Lemmon || Mount Lemmon Survey || — || align=right | 3.4 km || 
|-id=699 bgcolor=#E9E9E9
| 466699 ||  || — || March 10, 2011 || Mount Lemmon || Mount Lemmon Survey || — || align=right | 1.7 km || 
|-id=700 bgcolor=#E9E9E9
| 466700 ||  || — || April 28, 2012 || Mount Lemmon || Mount Lemmon Survey || — || align=right | 2.2 km || 
|}

466701–466800 

|-bgcolor=#E9E9E9
| 466701 ||  || — || October 27, 2009 || Mount Lemmon || Mount Lemmon Survey || — || align=right | 1.6 km || 
|-id=702 bgcolor=#E9E9E9
| 466702 ||  || — || April 28, 2012 || Mount Lemmon || Mount Lemmon Survey || ADE || align=right | 1.6 km || 
|-id=703 bgcolor=#E9E9E9
| 466703 ||  || — || April 20, 2012 || Kitt Peak || Spacewatch || — || align=right | 1.3 km || 
|-id=704 bgcolor=#d6d6d6
| 466704 ||  || — || September 23, 2008 || Mount Lemmon || Mount Lemmon Survey || HYG || align=right | 2.3 km || 
|-id=705 bgcolor=#fefefe
| 466705 ||  || — || January 7, 2002 || Kitt Peak || Spacewatch || — || align=right data-sort-value="0.82" | 820 m || 
|-id=706 bgcolor=#E9E9E9
| 466706 ||  || — || November 5, 1996 || Kitt Peak || Spacewatch || — || align=right | 1.6 km || 
|-id=707 bgcolor=#fefefe
| 466707 ||  || — || May 5, 2013 || Mount Lemmon || Mount Lemmon Survey || — || align=right data-sort-value="0.71" | 710 m || 
|-id=708 bgcolor=#d6d6d6
| 466708 ||  || — || December 16, 2009 || Mount Lemmon || Mount Lemmon Survey || — || align=right | 2.3 km || 
|-id=709 bgcolor=#E9E9E9
| 466709 ||  || — || November 21, 2005 || Kitt Peak || Spacewatch || — || align=right | 1.7 km || 
|-id=710 bgcolor=#fefefe
| 466710 ||  || — || January 1, 2008 || Kitt Peak || Spacewatch || — || align=right data-sort-value="0.94" | 940 m || 
|-id=711 bgcolor=#fefefe
| 466711 ||  || — || October 20, 2003 || Kitt Peak || Spacewatch || MAS || align=right data-sort-value="0.67" | 670 m || 
|-id=712 bgcolor=#d6d6d6
| 466712 ||  || — || March 10, 2005 || Catalina || CSS || — || align=right | 2.7 km || 
|-id=713 bgcolor=#E9E9E9
| 466713 ||  || — || January 26, 2011 || Mount Lemmon || Mount Lemmon Survey || — || align=right | 1.6 km || 
|-id=714 bgcolor=#E9E9E9
| 466714 ||  || — || November 25, 2005 || Catalina || CSS || — || align=right | 1.6 km || 
|-id=715 bgcolor=#E9E9E9
| 466715 ||  || — || December 8, 2010 || Kitt Peak || Spacewatch || — || align=right data-sort-value="0.85" | 850 m || 
|-id=716 bgcolor=#fefefe
| 466716 ||  || — || October 8, 2007 || Mount Lemmon || Mount Lemmon Survey || — || align=right data-sort-value="0.64" | 640 m || 
|-id=717 bgcolor=#d6d6d6
| 466717 ||  || — || October 1, 2003 || Anderson Mesa || LONEOS || — || align=right | 2.8 km || 
|-id=718 bgcolor=#d6d6d6
| 466718 ||  || — || December 17, 2003 || Socorro || LINEAR || — || align=right | 2.8 km || 
|-id=719 bgcolor=#d6d6d6
| 466719 ||  || — || January 12, 2010 || WISE || WISE || — || align=right | 3.2 km || 
|-id=720 bgcolor=#E9E9E9
| 466720 ||  || — || March 21, 2006 || Mount Lemmon || Mount Lemmon Survey || DOR || align=right | 3.1 km || 
|-id=721 bgcolor=#d6d6d6
| 466721 ||  || — || September 18, 1995 || Kitt Peak || Spacewatch || — || align=right | 3.0 km || 
|-id=722 bgcolor=#d6d6d6
| 466722 ||  || — || September 19, 2001 || Socorro || LINEAR || — || align=right | 3.7 km || 
|-id=723 bgcolor=#fefefe
| 466723 ||  || — || March 24, 2009 || Mount Lemmon || Mount Lemmon Survey || — || align=right data-sort-value="0.95" | 950 m || 
|-id=724 bgcolor=#d6d6d6
| 466724 ||  || — || October 1, 2008 || Catalina || CSS || — || align=right | 3.7 km || 
|-id=725 bgcolor=#d6d6d6
| 466725 ||  || — || March 7, 2005 || Socorro || LINEAR || — || align=right | 3.9 km || 
|-id=726 bgcolor=#E9E9E9
| 466726 ||  || — || December 10, 2006 || Kitt Peak || Spacewatch || — || align=right data-sort-value="0.77" | 770 m || 
|-id=727 bgcolor=#fefefe
| 466727 ||  || — || December 3, 2007 || Kitt Peak || Spacewatch || — || align=right data-sort-value="0.89" | 890 m || 
|-id=728 bgcolor=#d6d6d6
| 466728 ||  || — || October 14, 1998 || Kitt Peak || Spacewatch || — || align=right | 2.1 km || 
|-id=729 bgcolor=#E9E9E9
| 466729 ||  || — || January 25, 2006 || Kitt Peak || Spacewatch || HOF || align=right | 2.5 km || 
|-id=730 bgcolor=#d6d6d6
| 466730 ||  || — || January 21, 2004 || Socorro || LINEAR || EOS || align=right | 3.2 km || 
|-id=731 bgcolor=#E9E9E9
| 466731 ||  || — || December 6, 2005 || Kitt Peak || Spacewatch || — || align=right | 1.8 km || 
|-id=732 bgcolor=#d6d6d6
| 466732 ||  || — || May 17, 2010 || WISE || WISE || — || align=right | 5.0 km || 
|-id=733 bgcolor=#d6d6d6
| 466733 ||  || — || September 20, 1998 || Kitt Peak || Spacewatch || — || align=right | 2.2 km || 
|-id=734 bgcolor=#d6d6d6
| 466734 ||  || — || February 14, 2005 || Kitt Peak || Spacewatch || EOS || align=right | 1.6 km || 
|-id=735 bgcolor=#d6d6d6
| 466735 ||  || — || June 16, 2010 || WISE || WISE || — || align=right | 3.8 km || 
|-id=736 bgcolor=#d6d6d6
| 466736 ||  || — || February 22, 1998 || Kitt Peak || Spacewatch || — || align=right | 3.1 km || 
|-id=737 bgcolor=#d6d6d6
| 466737 ||  || — || January 21, 2009 || Mount Lemmon || Mount Lemmon Survey || URS || align=right | 3.6 km || 
|-id=738 bgcolor=#fefefe
| 466738 ||  || — || February 7, 2008 || Mount Lemmon || Mount Lemmon Survey || — || align=right data-sort-value="0.87" | 870 m || 
|-id=739 bgcolor=#d6d6d6
| 466739 ||  || — || October 21, 2008 || Kitt Peak || Spacewatch || — || align=right | 3.1 km || 
|-id=740 bgcolor=#E9E9E9
| 466740 ||  || — || October 26, 2005 || Kitt Peak || Spacewatch || — || align=right | 1.5 km || 
|-id=741 bgcolor=#d6d6d6
| 466741 ||  || — || January 1, 2009 || Mount Lemmon || Mount Lemmon Survey || — || align=right | 3.9 km || 
|-id=742 bgcolor=#d6d6d6
| 466742 ||  || — || April 13, 2011 || Mount Lemmon || Mount Lemmon Survey || — || align=right | 4.1 km || 
|-id=743 bgcolor=#E9E9E9
| 466743 ||  || — || December 24, 2006 || Catalina || CSS || — || align=right | 1.0 km || 
|-id=744 bgcolor=#fefefe
| 466744 ||  || — || March 10, 2005 || Mount Lemmon || Mount Lemmon Survey || — || align=right data-sort-value="0.71" | 710 m || 
|-id=745 bgcolor=#d6d6d6
| 466745 ||  || — || March 24, 2006 || Mount Lemmon || Mount Lemmon Survey || — || align=right | 2.0 km || 
|-id=746 bgcolor=#d6d6d6
| 466746 ||  || — || December 30, 2008 || Kitt Peak || Spacewatch || — || align=right | 3.1 km || 
|-id=747 bgcolor=#d6d6d6
| 466747 ||  || — || November 18, 2008 || Kitt Peak || Spacewatch || — || align=right | 3.3 km || 
|-id=748 bgcolor=#E9E9E9
| 466748 ||  || — || November 16, 2009 || Mount Lemmon || Mount Lemmon Survey || — || align=right | 1.6 km || 
|-id=749 bgcolor=#E9E9E9
| 466749 ||  || — || October 1, 2005 || Kitt Peak || Spacewatch || — || align=right | 1.7 km || 
|-id=750 bgcolor=#E9E9E9
| 466750 ||  || — || November 19, 2009 || Kitt Peak || Spacewatch || AGN || align=right | 1.2 km || 
|-id=751 bgcolor=#d6d6d6
| 466751 ||  || — || October 27, 2008 || Kitt Peak || Spacewatch || — || align=right | 2.7 km || 
|-id=752 bgcolor=#d6d6d6
| 466752 ||  || — || April 24, 2006 || Kitt Peak || Spacewatch || KOR || align=right | 1.4 km || 
|-id=753 bgcolor=#E9E9E9
| 466753 ||  || — || January 23, 2006 || Kitt Peak || Spacewatch || AGN || align=right | 1.3 km || 
|-id=754 bgcolor=#E9E9E9
| 466754 ||  || — || September 6, 2008 || Mount Lemmon || Mount Lemmon Survey || AGN || align=right | 1.1 km || 
|-id=755 bgcolor=#d6d6d6
| 466755 ||  || — || September 10, 2007 || Catalina || CSS || EOS || align=right | 2.0 km || 
|-id=756 bgcolor=#d6d6d6
| 466756 ||  || — || December 21, 2003 || Kitt Peak || Spacewatch || EOS || align=right | 1.7 km || 
|-id=757 bgcolor=#E9E9E9
| 466757 ||  || — || December 25, 2005 || Kitt Peak || Spacewatch || — || align=right | 1.4 km || 
|-id=758 bgcolor=#d6d6d6
| 466758 ||  || — || May 20, 2012 || Mount Lemmon || Mount Lemmon Survey || EOS || align=right | 1.8 km || 
|-id=759 bgcolor=#E9E9E9
| 466759 ||  || — || August 21, 2004 || Siding Spring || SSS || — || align=right | 1.6 km || 
|-id=760 bgcolor=#E9E9E9
| 466760 ||  || — || March 14, 2007 || Mount Lemmon || Mount Lemmon Survey || — || align=right | 1.6 km || 
|-id=761 bgcolor=#E9E9E9
| 466761 ||  || — || October 10, 2005 || Kitt Peak || Spacewatch || — || align=right data-sort-value="0.94" | 940 m || 
|-id=762 bgcolor=#E9E9E9
| 466762 ||  || — || May 19, 2012 || Mount Lemmon || Mount Lemmon Survey || — || align=right | 1.1 km || 
|-id=763 bgcolor=#d6d6d6
| 466763 ||  || — || April 12, 2011 || Mount Lemmon || Mount Lemmon Survey || EOS || align=right | 1.8 km || 
|-id=764 bgcolor=#d6d6d6
| 466764 ||  || — || October 24, 2003 || Kitt Peak || Spacewatch || — || align=right | 2.2 km || 
|-id=765 bgcolor=#d6d6d6
| 466765 ||  || — || January 8, 2010 || Kitt Peak || Spacewatch || — || align=right | 3.2 km || 
|-id=766 bgcolor=#d6d6d6
| 466766 ||  || — || November 30, 2008 || Kitt Peak || Spacewatch || — || align=right | 3.1 km || 
|-id=767 bgcolor=#d6d6d6
| 466767 ||  || — || September 10, 2007 || Mount Lemmon || Mount Lemmon Survey || — || align=right | 2.8 km || 
|-id=768 bgcolor=#d6d6d6
| 466768 ||  || — || January 15, 2004 || Kitt Peak || Spacewatch || — || align=right | 2.9 km || 
|-id=769 bgcolor=#E9E9E9
| 466769 ||  || — || March 19, 2007 || Mount Lemmon || Mount Lemmon Survey || — || align=right | 1.7 km || 
|-id=770 bgcolor=#d6d6d6
| 466770 ||  || — || May 6, 2010 || WISE || WISE || — || align=right | 4.2 km || 
|-id=771 bgcolor=#E9E9E9
| 466771 ||  || — || January 24, 2006 || Kitt Peak || Spacewatch || WIT || align=right | 1.1 km || 
|-id=772 bgcolor=#E9E9E9
| 466772 ||  || — || February 10, 2007 || Mount Lemmon || Mount Lemmon Survey || — || align=right | 1.2 km || 
|-id=773 bgcolor=#d6d6d6
| 466773 ||  || — || March 26, 2011 || Mount Lemmon || Mount Lemmon Survey || — || align=right | 3.3 km || 
|-id=774 bgcolor=#d6d6d6
| 466774 ||  || — || December 30, 2008 || Mount Lemmon || Mount Lemmon Survey || — || align=right | 3.4 km || 
|-id=775 bgcolor=#d6d6d6
| 466775 ||  || — || January 19, 2004 || Kitt Peak || Spacewatch || — || align=right | 2.5 km || 
|-id=776 bgcolor=#E9E9E9
| 466776 ||  || — || March 16, 2007 || Mount Lemmon || Mount Lemmon Survey || — || align=right | 2.2 km || 
|-id=777 bgcolor=#E9E9E9
| 466777 ||  || — || February 1, 2006 || Kitt Peak || Spacewatch || AGN || align=right | 1.3 km || 
|-id=778 bgcolor=#E9E9E9
| 466778 ||  || — || March 14, 2007 || Kitt Peak || Spacewatch || — || align=right | 1.2 km || 
|-id=779 bgcolor=#d6d6d6
| 466779 ||  || — || September 9, 2007 || Kitt Peak || Spacewatch || — || align=right | 3.4 km || 
|-id=780 bgcolor=#d6d6d6
| 466780 ||  || — || March 29, 2011 || Kitt Peak || Spacewatch || — || align=right | 2.3 km || 
|-id=781 bgcolor=#d6d6d6
| 466781 ||  || — || May 21, 2006 || Kitt Peak || Spacewatch || — || align=right | 2.5 km || 
|-id=782 bgcolor=#d6d6d6
| 466782 ||  || — || April 11, 2005 || Mount Lemmon || Mount Lemmon Survey || — || align=right | 3.5 km || 
|-id=783 bgcolor=#E9E9E9
| 466783 ||  || — || November 15, 2010 || Mount Lemmon || Mount Lemmon Survey || — || align=right | 1.7 km || 
|-id=784 bgcolor=#fefefe
| 466784 ||  || — || September 17, 1996 || Kitt Peak || Spacewatch || — || align=right data-sort-value="0.85" | 850 m || 
|-id=785 bgcolor=#d6d6d6
| 466785 ||  || — || September 11, 2007 || Mount Lemmon || Mount Lemmon Survey || — || align=right | 2.6 km || 
|-id=786 bgcolor=#E9E9E9
| 466786 ||  || — || August 17, 2009 || Kitt Peak || Spacewatch || EUN || align=right | 1.1 km || 
|-id=787 bgcolor=#E9E9E9
| 466787 ||  || — || September 6, 2013 || Mount Lemmon || Mount Lemmon Survey || — || align=right | 2.2 km || 
|-id=788 bgcolor=#E9E9E9
| 466788 ||  || — || February 19, 2001 || Socorro || LINEAR || — || align=right | 2.0 km || 
|-id=789 bgcolor=#d6d6d6
| 466789 ||  || — || February 11, 2008 || Mount Lemmon || Mount Lemmon Survey || 3:2 || align=right | 4.4 km || 
|-id=790 bgcolor=#d6d6d6
| 466790 ||  || — || September 10, 2007 || Kitt Peak || Spacewatch || EOS || align=right | 1.9 km || 
|-id=791 bgcolor=#d6d6d6
| 466791 ||  || — || March 17, 2010 || Kitt Peak || Spacewatch || — || align=right | 3.3 km || 
|-id=792 bgcolor=#d6d6d6
| 466792 ||  || — || December 30, 2013 || Mount Lemmon || Mount Lemmon Survey || — || align=right | 2.7 km || 
|-id=793 bgcolor=#d6d6d6
| 466793 ||  || — || November 7, 2008 || Mount Lemmon || Mount Lemmon Survey || EOS || align=right | 1.7 km || 
|-id=794 bgcolor=#E9E9E9
| 466794 ||  || — || October 17, 1995 || Kitt Peak || Spacewatch || — || align=right | 1.8 km || 
|-id=795 bgcolor=#d6d6d6
| 466795 ||  || — || November 30, 2003 || Kitt Peak || Spacewatch || — || align=right | 2.3 km || 
|-id=796 bgcolor=#E9E9E9
| 466796 ||  || — || October 7, 2004 || Socorro || LINEAR || — || align=right | 2.2 km || 
|-id=797 bgcolor=#E9E9E9
| 466797 ||  || — || March 9, 2011 || Kitt Peak || Spacewatch || — || align=right | 2.9 km || 
|-id=798 bgcolor=#d6d6d6
| 466798 ||  || — || October 2, 2003 || Kitt Peak || Spacewatch ||  || align=right | 2.5 km || 
|-id=799 bgcolor=#d6d6d6
| 466799 ||  || — || February 9, 2010 || Kitt Peak || Spacewatch || — || align=right | 2.6 km || 
|-id=800 bgcolor=#d6d6d6
| 466800 ||  || — || April 14, 2011 || Mount Lemmon || Mount Lemmon Survey || EOS || align=right | 1.8 km || 
|}

466801–466900 

|-bgcolor=#E9E9E9
| 466801 ||  || — || February 25, 2007 || Mount Lemmon || Mount Lemmon Survey || RAF || align=right data-sort-value="0.97" | 970 m || 
|-id=802 bgcolor=#E9E9E9
| 466802 ||  || — || October 4, 2004 || Kitt Peak || Spacewatch || — || align=right | 1.6 km || 
|-id=803 bgcolor=#d6d6d6
| 466803 ||  || — || October 20, 2008 || Kitt Peak || Spacewatch || EOS || align=right | 2.5 km || 
|-id=804 bgcolor=#E9E9E9
| 466804 ||  || — || December 25, 2005 || Mount Lemmon || Mount Lemmon Survey || — || align=right | 2.6 km || 
|-id=805 bgcolor=#d6d6d6
| 466805 ||  || — || January 8, 2009 || Kitt Peak || Spacewatch || — || align=right | 3.0 km || 
|-id=806 bgcolor=#d6d6d6
| 466806 ||  || — || June 11, 2010 || WISE || WISE || — || align=right | 3.3 km || 
|-id=807 bgcolor=#d6d6d6
| 466807 ||  || — || November 10, 2005 || Kitt Peak || Spacewatch || 3:2 || align=right | 4.2 km || 
|-id=808 bgcolor=#d6d6d6
| 466808 ||  || — || April 2, 2005 || Catalina || CSS || — || align=right | 3.5 km || 
|-id=809 bgcolor=#d6d6d6
| 466809 ||  || — || May 1, 2010 || WISE || WISE || — || align=right | 3.2 km || 
|-id=810 bgcolor=#d6d6d6
| 466810 ||  || — || September 21, 2003 || Kitt Peak || Spacewatch || KOR || align=right | 1.4 km || 
|-id=811 bgcolor=#d6d6d6
| 466811 ||  || — || April 12, 2004 || Kitt Peak || Spacewatch || HYG || align=right | 4.0 km || 
|-id=812 bgcolor=#d6d6d6
| 466812 ||  || — || August 26, 2012 || Mount Lemmon || Mount Lemmon Survey || VER || align=right | 2.4 km || 
|-id=813 bgcolor=#E9E9E9
| 466813 ||  || — || October 8, 2008 || Kitt Peak || Spacewatch || AGN || align=right | 1.2 km || 
|-id=814 bgcolor=#E9E9E9
| 466814 ||  || — || March 31, 2003 || Kitt Peak || Spacewatch || — || align=right | 1.6 km || 
|-id=815 bgcolor=#E9E9E9
| 466815 ||  || — || December 16, 2009 || Mount Lemmon || Mount Lemmon Survey || — || align=right | 2.7 km || 
|-id=816 bgcolor=#E9E9E9
| 466816 ||  || — || November 10, 2004 || Kitt Peak || Spacewatch || AGN || align=right | 1.3 km || 
|-id=817 bgcolor=#d6d6d6
| 466817 ||  || — || December 16, 2007 || Mount Lemmon || Mount Lemmon Survey || SYL7:4 || align=right | 4.0 km || 
|-id=818 bgcolor=#E9E9E9
| 466818 ||  || — || January 11, 1994 || Kitt Peak || Spacewatch || — || align=right | 2.3 km || 
|-id=819 bgcolor=#d6d6d6
| 466819 ||  || — || November 1, 2008 || Mount Lemmon || Mount Lemmon Survey || — || align=right | 3.3 km || 
|-id=820 bgcolor=#E9E9E9
| 466820 ||  || — || September 20, 2008 || Mount Lemmon || Mount Lemmon Survey || — || align=right | 2.2 km || 
|-id=821 bgcolor=#E9E9E9
| 466821 ||  || — || March 4, 2011 || Mount Lemmon || Mount Lemmon Survey || EUN || align=right | 1.4 km || 
|-id=822 bgcolor=#d6d6d6
| 466822 ||  || — || September 29, 1997 || Kitt Peak || Spacewatch || — || align=right | 2.6 km || 
|-id=823 bgcolor=#d6d6d6
| 466823 ||  || — || September 21, 2012 || Mount Lemmon || Mount Lemmon Survey || — || align=right | 2.7 km || 
|-id=824 bgcolor=#d6d6d6
| 466824 ||  || — || September 25, 2006 || Mount Lemmon || Mount Lemmon Survey || 7:4 || align=right | 3.1 km || 
|-id=825 bgcolor=#E9E9E9
| 466825 ||  || — || March 6, 2011 || Kitt Peak || Spacewatch || — || align=right | 2.3 km || 
|-id=826 bgcolor=#d6d6d6
| 466826 ||  || — || December 17, 2003 || Kitt Peak || Spacewatch || — || align=right | 2.7 km || 
|-id=827 bgcolor=#d6d6d6
| 466827 ||  || — || August 16, 2007 || XuYi || PMO NEO || — || align=right | 2.5 km || 
|-id=828 bgcolor=#d6d6d6
| 466828 ||  || — || April 16, 2005 || Kitt Peak || Spacewatch || THM || align=right | 2.5 km || 
|-id=829 bgcolor=#E9E9E9
| 466829 ||  || — || February 2, 2006 || Mount Lemmon || Mount Lemmon Survey || — || align=right | 2.0 km || 
|-id=830 bgcolor=#E9E9E9
| 466830 ||  || — || October 5, 2004 || Kitt Peak || Spacewatch || — || align=right | 2.0 km || 
|-id=831 bgcolor=#E9E9E9
| 466831 ||  || — || November 4, 2004 || Kitt Peak || Spacewatch || — || align=right | 2.4 km || 
|-id=832 bgcolor=#E9E9E9
| 466832 ||  || — || April 22, 2012 || Kitt Peak || Spacewatch || — || align=right | 2.9 km || 
|-id=833 bgcolor=#d6d6d6
| 466833 ||  || — || February 14, 2010 || Mount Lemmon || Mount Lemmon Survey || EOS || align=right | 1.6 km || 
|-id=834 bgcolor=#E9E9E9
| 466834 ||  || — || October 5, 2004 || Kitt Peak || Spacewatch || — || align=right | 1.9 km || 
|-id=835 bgcolor=#d6d6d6
| 466835 ||  || — || March 7, 2008 || Kitt Peak || Spacewatch || 3:2 || align=right | 3.1 km || 
|-id=836 bgcolor=#E9E9E9
| 466836 ||  || — || January 13, 2011 || Mount Lemmon || Mount Lemmon Survey || — || align=right data-sort-value="0.77" | 770 m || 
|-id=837 bgcolor=#d6d6d6
| 466837 ||  || — || September 10, 2007 || Kitt Peak || Spacewatch || — || align=right | 2.5 km || 
|-id=838 bgcolor=#d6d6d6
| 466838 ||  || — || September 14, 2007 || Kitt Peak || Spacewatch || EOS || align=right | 1.9 km || 
|-id=839 bgcolor=#d6d6d6
| 466839 ||  || — || September 29, 2008 || Mount Lemmon || Mount Lemmon Survey || — || align=right | 2.5 km || 
|-id=840 bgcolor=#d6d6d6
| 466840 ||  || — || June 6, 2010 || WISE || WISE || — || align=right | 2.7 km || 
|-id=841 bgcolor=#E9E9E9
| 466841 ||  || — || September 7, 2004 || Kitt Peak || Spacewatch || — || align=right | 1.4 km || 
|-id=842 bgcolor=#E9E9E9
| 466842 ||  || — || January 23, 2006 || Mount Lemmon || Mount Lemmon Survey || — || align=right | 2.0 km || 
|-id=843 bgcolor=#E9E9E9
| 466843 ||  || — || September 7, 2004 || Kitt Peak || Spacewatch || — || align=right | 1.6 km || 
|-id=844 bgcolor=#d6d6d6
| 466844 ||  || — || December 18, 2004 || Mount Lemmon || Mount Lemmon Survey || — || align=right | 2.2 km || 
|-id=845 bgcolor=#d6d6d6
| 466845 ||  || — || September 9, 2007 || Kitt Peak || Spacewatch || — || align=right | 2.5 km || 
|-id=846 bgcolor=#d6d6d6
| 466846 ||  || — || November 1, 2008 || Kitt Peak || Spacewatch || — || align=right | 2.4 km || 
|-id=847 bgcolor=#E9E9E9
| 466847 ||  || — || June 17, 2005 || Mount Lemmon || Mount Lemmon Survey || MAR || align=right | 1.2 km || 
|-id=848 bgcolor=#d6d6d6
| 466848 ||  || — || February 17, 2010 || Kitt Peak || Spacewatch || — || align=right | 2.9 km || 
|-id=849 bgcolor=#E9E9E9
| 466849 ||  || — || November 6, 2005 || Mount Lemmon || Mount Lemmon Survey || — || align=right | 1.2 km || 
|-id=850 bgcolor=#d6d6d6
| 466850 ||  || — || February 18, 2010 || Mount Lemmon || Mount Lemmon Survey || — || align=right | 3.1 km || 
|-id=851 bgcolor=#d6d6d6
| 466851 ||  || — || April 12, 2010 || Mount Lemmon || Mount Lemmon Survey || — || align=right | 4.0 km || 
|-id=852 bgcolor=#E9E9E9
| 466852 ||  || — || September 30, 2005 || Mount Lemmon || Mount Lemmon Survey || — || align=right data-sort-value="0.82" | 820 m || 
|-id=853 bgcolor=#d6d6d6
| 466853 ||  || — || March 18, 2004 || Socorro || LINEAR || — || align=right | 3.2 km || 
|-id=854 bgcolor=#d6d6d6
| 466854 ||  || — || June 3, 2011 || Mount Lemmon || Mount Lemmon Survey || EOS || align=right | 2.0 km || 
|-id=855 bgcolor=#d6d6d6
| 466855 ||  || — || June 5, 2006 || Mount Lemmon || Mount Lemmon Survey || — || align=right | 3.2 km || 
|-id=856 bgcolor=#E9E9E9
| 466856 ||  || — || April 25, 2007 || Kitt Peak || Spacewatch || — || align=right | 1.9 km || 
|-id=857 bgcolor=#d6d6d6
| 466857 ||  || — || November 2, 2008 || Mount Lemmon || Mount Lemmon Survey ||  || align=right | 3.3 km || 
|-id=858 bgcolor=#d6d6d6
| 466858 ||  || — || April 27, 2011 || Kitt Peak || Spacewatch || VER || align=right | 3.4 km || 
|-id=859 bgcolor=#d6d6d6
| 466859 ||  || — || November 24, 2008 || Kitt Peak || Spacewatch || EOS || align=right | 1.9 km || 
|-id=860 bgcolor=#fefefe
| 466860 ||  || — || October 20, 2003 || Kitt Peak || Spacewatch || — || align=right data-sort-value="0.78" | 780 m || 
|-id=861 bgcolor=#d6d6d6
| 466861 ||  || — || May 8, 2005 || Kitt Peak || Spacewatch || — || align=right | 3.2 km || 
|-id=862 bgcolor=#d6d6d6
| 466862 ||  || — || October 23, 2008 || Kitt Peak || Spacewatch || — || align=right | 2.4 km || 
|-id=863 bgcolor=#d6d6d6
| 466863 ||  || — || August 24, 2008 || Kitt Peak || Spacewatch || — || align=right | 3.2 km || 
|-id=864 bgcolor=#E9E9E9
| 466864 ||  || — || January 10, 2006 || Kitt Peak || Spacewatch || — || align=right | 1.6 km || 
|-id=865 bgcolor=#d6d6d6
| 466865 ||  || — || October 7, 2007 || Kitt Peak || Spacewatch || — || align=right | 3.1 km || 
|-id=866 bgcolor=#d6d6d6
| 466866 ||  || — || February 16, 2010 || Kitt Peak || Spacewatch || TEL || align=right | 1.4 km || 
|-id=867 bgcolor=#E9E9E9
| 466867 ||  || — || April 30, 2003 || Kitt Peak || Spacewatch || — || align=right | 1.5 km || 
|-id=868 bgcolor=#d6d6d6
| 466868 ||  || — || February 16, 2010 || Kitt Peak || Spacewatch || EOS || align=right | 2.0 km || 
|-id=869 bgcolor=#d6d6d6
| 466869 ||  || — || February 14, 2010 || WISE || WISE || 7:4 || align=right | 5.6 km || 
|-id=870 bgcolor=#d6d6d6
| 466870 ||  || — || September 4, 2007 || Mount Lemmon || Mount Lemmon Survey || — || align=right | 2.4 km || 
|-id=871 bgcolor=#d6d6d6
| 466871 ||  || — || August 24, 2007 || Kitt Peak || Spacewatch || — || align=right | 2.3 km || 
|-id=872 bgcolor=#d6d6d6
| 466872 ||  || — || December 20, 1995 || Kitt Peak || Spacewatch || — || align=right | 2.7 km || 
|-id=873 bgcolor=#E9E9E9
| 466873 ||  || — || January 6, 2010 || Kitt Peak || Spacewatch || GEF || align=right | 1.4 km || 
|-id=874 bgcolor=#d6d6d6
| 466874 ||  || — || June 10, 2010 || WISE || WISE || — || align=right | 4.5 km || 
|-id=875 bgcolor=#fefefe
| 466875 ||  || — || November 19, 1995 || Kitt Peak || Spacewatch || — || align=right | 1.1 km || 
|-id=876 bgcolor=#d6d6d6
| 466876 ||  || — || September 19, 1995 || Kitt Peak || Spacewatch || — || align=right | 5.3 km || 
|-id=877 bgcolor=#d6d6d6
| 466877 ||  || — || January 20, 2009 || Mount Lemmon || Mount Lemmon Survey || — || align=right | 3.6 km || 
|-id=878 bgcolor=#E9E9E9
| 466878 ||  || — || February 10, 2002 || Socorro || LINEAR || — || align=right | 1.7 km || 
|-id=879 bgcolor=#d6d6d6
| 466879 ||  || — || November 19, 2008 || Kitt Peak || Spacewatch || — || align=right | 3.2 km || 
|-id=880 bgcolor=#d6d6d6
| 466880 ||  || — || January 18, 1998 || Kitt Peak || Spacewatch || — || align=right | 3.2 km || 
|-id=881 bgcolor=#d6d6d6
| 466881 ||  || — || April 2, 2006 || Kitt Peak || Spacewatch || KOR || align=right | 1.4 km || 
|-id=882 bgcolor=#d6d6d6
| 466882 ||  || — || December 30, 2008 || Kitt Peak || Spacewatch || — || align=right | 3.6 km || 
|-id=883 bgcolor=#d6d6d6
| 466883 ||  || — || February 2, 2009 || Kitt Peak || Spacewatch || — || align=right | 2.4 km || 
|-id=884 bgcolor=#d6d6d6
| 466884 ||  || — || December 29, 2008 || Kitt Peak || Spacewatch || — || align=right | 2.5 km || 
|-id=885 bgcolor=#E9E9E9
| 466885 ||  || — || September 15, 2004 || Anderson Mesa || LONEOS || — || align=right | 1.5 km || 
|-id=886 bgcolor=#d6d6d6
| 466886 ||  || — || February 2, 2009 || Mount Lemmon || Mount Lemmon Survey || — || align=right | 3.4 km || 
|-id=887 bgcolor=#d6d6d6
| 466887 ||  || — || June 4, 2011 || Mount Lemmon || Mount Lemmon Survey || — || align=right | 3.7 km || 
|-id=888 bgcolor=#d6d6d6
| 466888 ||  || — || December 1, 2008 || Kitt Peak || Spacewatch || — || align=right | 2.8 km || 
|-id=889 bgcolor=#d6d6d6
| 466889 ||  || — || October 19, 2007 || Catalina || CSS || — || align=right | 3.5 km || 
|-id=890 bgcolor=#d6d6d6
| 466890 ||  || — || November 2, 2007 || Mount Lemmon || Mount Lemmon Survey || — || align=right | 3.3 km || 
|-id=891 bgcolor=#d6d6d6
| 466891 ||  || — || December 23, 2013 || Mount Lemmon || Mount Lemmon Survey || HYG || align=right | 3.1 km || 
|-id=892 bgcolor=#E9E9E9
| 466892 ||  || — || October 30, 2005 || Kitt Peak || Spacewatch || — || align=right data-sort-value="0.94" | 940 m || 
|-id=893 bgcolor=#d6d6d6
| 466893 ||  || — || September 10, 2007 || Mount Lemmon || Mount Lemmon Survey || VER || align=right | 2.2 km || 
|-id=894 bgcolor=#d6d6d6
| 466894 ||  || — || December 19, 2003 || Kitt Peak || Spacewatch || — || align=right | 3.4 km || 
|-id=895 bgcolor=#E9E9E9
| 466895 ||  || — || November 9, 2004 || Catalina || CSS || — || align=right | 2.9 km || 
|-id=896 bgcolor=#E9E9E9
| 466896 ||  || — || January 23, 2006 || Kitt Peak || Spacewatch || — || align=right | 2.1 km || 
|-id=897 bgcolor=#E9E9E9
| 466897 ||  || — || December 27, 2005 || Mount Lemmon || Mount Lemmon Survey || — || align=right | 2.1 km || 
|-id=898 bgcolor=#d6d6d6
| 466898 ||  || — || May 24, 2010 || WISE || WISE || — || align=right | 5.4 km || 
|-id=899 bgcolor=#d6d6d6
| 466899 ||  || — || September 26, 2007 || Mount Lemmon || Mount Lemmon Survey || EOS || align=right | 2.1 km || 
|-id=900 bgcolor=#E9E9E9
| 466900 ||  || — || October 9, 2004 || Socorro || LINEAR || — || align=right | 2.3 km || 
|}

466901–467000 

|-bgcolor=#E9E9E9
| 466901 ||  || — || February 27, 2006 || Kitt Peak || Spacewatch || — || align=right | 2.4 km || 
|-id=902 bgcolor=#d6d6d6
| 466902 ||  || — || November 6, 2008 || Mount Lemmon || Mount Lemmon Survey || — || align=right | 3.3 km || 
|-id=903 bgcolor=#d6d6d6
| 466903 ||  || — || September 12, 2001 || Socorro || LINEAR || URS || align=right | 3.3 km || 
|-id=904 bgcolor=#d6d6d6
| 466904 ||  || — || March 15, 2004 || Kitt Peak || Spacewatch || — || align=right | 3.9 km || 
|-id=905 bgcolor=#d6d6d6
| 466905 ||  || — || October 21, 2007 || Mount Lemmon || Mount Lemmon Survey || — || align=right | 3.4 km || 
|-id=906 bgcolor=#d6d6d6
| 466906 ||  || — || January 24, 2010 || WISE || WISE || — || align=right | 2.5 km || 
|-id=907 bgcolor=#d6d6d6
| 466907 ||  || — || March 13, 2010 || Kitt Peak || Spacewatch || — || align=right | 3.5 km || 
|-id=908 bgcolor=#E9E9E9
| 466908 ||  || — || December 28, 2000 || Kitt Peak || Spacewatch || — || align=right | 2.4 km || 
|-id=909 bgcolor=#d6d6d6
| 466909 ||  || — || October 8, 2005 || Kitt Peak || Spacewatch || 7:4 || align=right | 3.6 km || 
|-id=910 bgcolor=#E9E9E9
| 466910 ||  || — || September 23, 2008 || Mount Lemmon || Mount Lemmon Survey || — || align=right | 3.0 km || 
|-id=911 bgcolor=#d6d6d6
| 466911 ||  || — || October 3, 2008 || Mount Lemmon || Mount Lemmon Survey || — || align=right | 3.2 km || 
|-id=912 bgcolor=#d6d6d6
| 466912 ||  || — || May 23, 2011 || Mount Lemmon || Mount Lemmon Survey || — || align=right | 3.5 km || 
|-id=913 bgcolor=#d6d6d6
| 466913 ||  || — || November 3, 2008 || Mount Lemmon || Mount Lemmon Survey || — || align=right | 2.3 km || 
|-id=914 bgcolor=#E9E9E9
| 466914 ||  || — || November 17, 2009 || Mount Lemmon || Mount Lemmon Survey || — || align=right | 3.5 km || 
|-id=915 bgcolor=#d6d6d6
| 466915 ||  || — || April 14, 2010 || Kitt Peak || Spacewatch || — || align=right | 2.8 km || 
|-id=916 bgcolor=#C2FFFF
| 466916 ||  || — || September 6, 2008 || Kitt Peak || Spacewatch || L4 || align=right | 7.5 km || 
|-id=917 bgcolor=#C2FFFF
| 466917 ||  || — || November 8, 2010 || Kitt Peak || Spacewatch || L4 || align=right | 9.9 km || 
|-id=918 bgcolor=#d6d6d6
| 466918 ||  || — || March 15, 2012 || Mount Lemmon || Mount Lemmon Survey || EOS || align=right | 1.8 km || 
|-id=919 bgcolor=#E9E9E9
| 466919 ||  || — || March 15, 2005 || Catalina || CSS || MAR || align=right | 1.5 km || 
|-id=920 bgcolor=#d6d6d6
| 466920 ||  || — || December 19, 2004 || Catalina || CSS || — || align=right | 2.8 km || 
|-id=921 bgcolor=#d6d6d6
| 466921 ||  || — || April 26, 2001 || Kitt Peak || Spacewatch || — || align=right | 3.1 km || 
|-id=922 bgcolor=#E9E9E9
| 466922 ||  || — || November 2, 2010 || Mount Lemmon || Mount Lemmon Survey || JUN || align=right data-sort-value="0.85" | 850 m || 
|-id=923 bgcolor=#E9E9E9
| 466923 ||  || — || October 27, 2005 || Mount Lemmon || Mount Lemmon Survey || — || align=right | 2.7 km || 
|-id=924 bgcolor=#d6d6d6
| 466924 ||  || — || September 18, 2009 || Kitt Peak || Spacewatch || — || align=right | 2.7 km || 
|-id=925 bgcolor=#d6d6d6
| 466925 ||  || — || November 10, 2009 || Kitt Peak || Spacewatch || EOS || align=right | 2.2 km || 
|-id=926 bgcolor=#fefefe
| 466926 || 2016 AE || — || December 12, 2004 || Campo Imperatore || CINEOS || NYS || align=right data-sort-value="0.76" | 760 m || 
|-id=927 bgcolor=#d6d6d6
| 466927 ||  || — || January 18, 2005 || Kitt Peak || Spacewatch || — || align=right | 3.5 km || 
|-id=928 bgcolor=#d6d6d6
| 466928 ||  || — || November 26, 2009 || Mount Lemmon || Mount Lemmon Survey || — || align=right | 3.1 km || 
|-id=929 bgcolor=#d6d6d6
| 466929 ||  || — || September 19, 2009 || Mount Lemmon || Mount Lemmon Survey || — || align=right | 2.9 km || 
|-id=930 bgcolor=#d6d6d6
| 466930 ||  || — || December 8, 2010 || Mount Lemmon || Mount Lemmon Survey || — || align=right | 3.8 km || 
|-id=931 bgcolor=#d6d6d6
| 466931 ||  || — || December 1, 2005 || Kitt Peak || Spacewatch || KOR || align=right | 1.7 km || 
|-id=932 bgcolor=#E9E9E9
| 466932 ||  || — || March 8, 2008 || Mount Lemmon || Mount Lemmon Survey || — || align=right data-sort-value="0.99" | 990 m || 
|-id=933 bgcolor=#fefefe
| 466933 ||  || — || February 2, 2005 || Kitt Peak || Spacewatch || NYS || align=right data-sort-value="0.66" | 660 m || 
|-id=934 bgcolor=#d6d6d6
| 466934 ||  || — || November 30, 2010 || Mount Lemmon || Mount Lemmon Survey || BRA || align=right | 2.0 km || 
|-id=935 bgcolor=#d6d6d6
| 466935 ||  || — || August 7, 2008 || Kitt Peak || Spacewatch || — || align=right | 3.0 km || 
|-id=936 bgcolor=#E9E9E9
| 466936 ||  || — || February 13, 2007 || Mount Lemmon || Mount Lemmon Survey || — || align=right | 2.0 km || 
|-id=937 bgcolor=#d6d6d6
| 466937 ||  || — || October 4, 2003 || Kitt Peak || Spacewatch || — || align=right | 3.2 km || 
|-id=938 bgcolor=#fefefe
| 466938 ||  || — || March 4, 2005 || Mount Lemmon || Mount Lemmon Survey || — || align=right data-sort-value="0.55" | 550 m || 
|-id=939 bgcolor=#fefefe
| 466939 ||  || — || January 17, 2005 || Kitt Peak || Spacewatch || — || align=right data-sort-value="0.82" | 820 m || 
|-id=940 bgcolor=#E9E9E9
| 466940 ||  || — || October 30, 2011 || Mount Lemmon || Mount Lemmon Survey || — || align=right | 1.8 km || 
|-id=941 bgcolor=#E9E9E9
| 466941 ||  || — || February 18, 2008 || Mount Lemmon || Mount Lemmon Survey || — || align=right data-sort-value="0.91" | 910 m || 
|-id=942 bgcolor=#E9E9E9
| 466942 ||  || — || July 5, 2005 || Kitt Peak || Spacewatch || MAR || align=right | 1.1 km || 
|-id=943 bgcolor=#fefefe
| 466943 ||  || — || December 29, 2011 || Mount Lemmon || Mount Lemmon Survey || — || align=right data-sort-value="0.77" | 770 m || 
|-id=944 bgcolor=#E9E9E9
| 466944 ||  || — || November 18, 2006 || Mount Lemmon || Mount Lemmon Survey || RAF || align=right data-sort-value="0.80" | 800 m || 
|-id=945 bgcolor=#E9E9E9
| 466945 ||  || — || November 27, 2006 || Mount Lemmon || Mount Lemmon Survey || — || align=right | 1.7 km || 
|-id=946 bgcolor=#E9E9E9
| 466946 ||  || — || November 17, 1995 || Kitt Peak || Spacewatch || GEF || align=right | 1.4 km || 
|-id=947 bgcolor=#d6d6d6
| 466947 ||  || — || March 9, 2005 || Mount Lemmon || Mount Lemmon Survey || — || align=right | 3.1 km || 
|-id=948 bgcolor=#d6d6d6
| 466948 ||  || — || May 21, 2006 || Catalina || CSS || — || align=right | 3.6 km || 
|-id=949 bgcolor=#E9E9E9
| 466949 ||  || — || March 19, 2007 || Mount Lemmon || Mount Lemmon Survey || — || align=right | 2.1 km || 
|-id=950 bgcolor=#E9E9E9
| 466950 ||  || — || January 10, 2007 || Kitt Peak || Spacewatch || — || align=right | 1.6 km || 
|-id=951 bgcolor=#d6d6d6
| 466951 ||  || — || October 21, 2008 || Kitt Peak || Spacewatch || — || align=right | 3.4 km || 
|-id=952 bgcolor=#E9E9E9
| 466952 ||  || — || April 3, 2003 || Anderson Mesa || LONEOS || JUN || align=right data-sort-value="0.98" | 980 m || 
|-id=953 bgcolor=#d6d6d6
| 466953 ||  || — || January 20, 2009 || Catalina || CSS || 7:4 || align=right | 4.3 km || 
|-id=954 bgcolor=#d6d6d6
| 466954 ||  || — || September 28, 2003 || Kitt Peak || Spacewatch || EOS || align=right | 1.9 km || 
|-id=955 bgcolor=#E9E9E9
| 466955 ||  || — || January 28, 2010 || WISE || WISE || — || align=right | 3.6 km || 
|-id=956 bgcolor=#E9E9E9
| 466956 ||  || — || August 30, 2005 || Kitt Peak || Spacewatch || — || align=right | 1.6 km || 
|-id=957 bgcolor=#d6d6d6
| 466957 ||  || — || January 15, 2010 || WISE || WISE || — || align=right | 3.4 km || 
|-id=958 bgcolor=#d6d6d6
| 466958 ||  || — || December 19, 2009 || Kitt Peak || Spacewatch || — || align=right | 4.3 km || 
|-id=959 bgcolor=#E9E9E9
| 466959 ||  || — || July 29, 2008 || Kitt Peak || Spacewatch || — || align=right | 3.2 km || 
|-id=960 bgcolor=#E9E9E9
| 466960 ||  || — || October 22, 2005 || Catalina || CSS || — || align=right | 1.8 km || 
|-id=961 bgcolor=#d6d6d6
| 466961 ||  || — || October 24, 2008 || Kitt Peak || Spacewatch || — || align=right | 3.5 km || 
|-id=962 bgcolor=#fefefe
| 466962 ||  || — || April 2, 2005 || Siding Spring || SSS || — || align=right | 1.3 km || 
|-id=963 bgcolor=#fefefe
| 466963 ||  || — || November 21, 2008 || Kitt Peak || Spacewatch || — || align=right | 1.3 km || 
|-id=964 bgcolor=#fefefe
| 466964 ||  || — || December 6, 2005 || Mount Lemmon || Mount Lemmon Survey || — || align=right data-sort-value="0.72" | 720 m || 
|-id=965 bgcolor=#fefefe
| 466965 ||  || — || November 30, 2008 || Mount Lemmon || Mount Lemmon Survey || — || align=right data-sort-value="0.85" | 850 m || 
|-id=966 bgcolor=#fefefe
| 466966 ||  || — || October 9, 1999 || Socorro || LINEAR || H || align=right data-sort-value="0.75" | 750 m || 
|-id=967 bgcolor=#E9E9E9
| 466967 ||  || — || September 14, 2005 || Kitt Peak || Spacewatch || NEM || align=right | 2.7 km || 
|-id=968 bgcolor=#E9E9E9
| 466968 ||  || — || February 17, 2007 || Catalina || CSS || — || align=right | 2.8 km || 
|-id=969 bgcolor=#d6d6d6
| 466969 ||  || — || October 24, 2008 || Catalina || CSS || EOS || align=right | 2.4 km || 
|-id=970 bgcolor=#E9E9E9
| 466970 ||  || — || July 29, 2009 || Kitt Peak || Spacewatch || — || align=right | 1.6 km || 
|-id=971 bgcolor=#d6d6d6
| 466971 ||  || — || December 19, 2004 || Kitt Peak || Spacewatch || — || align=right | 3.6 km || 
|-id=972 bgcolor=#d6d6d6
| 466972 ||  || — || October 1, 2008 || Mount Lemmon || Mount Lemmon Survey || — || align=right | 3.0 km || 
|-id=973 bgcolor=#fefefe
| 466973 ||  || — || December 19, 2003 || Kitt Peak || Spacewatch || — || align=right data-sort-value="0.89" | 890 m || 
|-id=974 bgcolor=#fefefe
| 466974 ||  || — || May 16, 2009 || Mount Lemmon || Mount Lemmon Survey || — || align=right data-sort-value="0.81" | 810 m || 
|-id=975 bgcolor=#E9E9E9
| 466975 ||  || — || March 31, 2008 || Kitt Peak || Spacewatch || — || align=right data-sort-value="0.99" | 990 m || 
|-id=976 bgcolor=#fefefe
| 466976 ||  || — || October 11, 2007 || Mount Lemmon || Mount Lemmon Survey || — || align=right data-sort-value="0.64" | 640 m || 
|-id=977 bgcolor=#fefefe
| 466977 ||  || — || November 13, 2007 || Mount Lemmon || Mount Lemmon Survey || H || align=right data-sort-value="0.69" | 690 m || 
|-id=978 bgcolor=#fefefe
| 466978 ||  || — || February 2, 2005 || Kitt Peak || Spacewatch || NYS || align=right data-sort-value="0.61" | 610 m || 
|-id=979 bgcolor=#E9E9E9
| 466979 ||  || — || February 2, 2008 || Kitt Peak || Spacewatch || — || align=right data-sort-value="0.90" | 900 m || 
|-id=980 bgcolor=#d6d6d6
| 466980 ||  || — || September 27, 2003 || Kitt Peak || Spacewatch || THM || align=right | 1.9 km || 
|-id=981 bgcolor=#fefefe
| 466981 ||  || — || January 30, 2009 || Mount Lemmon || Mount Lemmon Survey || NYS || align=right data-sort-value="0.54" | 540 m || 
|-id=982 bgcolor=#E9E9E9
| 466982 ||  || — || January 28, 2000 || Kitt Peak || Spacewatch || — || align=right data-sort-value="0.84" | 840 m || 
|-id=983 bgcolor=#E9E9E9
| 466983 ||  || — || November 5, 2010 || Mount Lemmon || Mount Lemmon Survey || EUN || align=right | 1.5 km || 
|-id=984 bgcolor=#d6d6d6
| 466984 ||  || — || February 12, 2002 || Kitt Peak || Spacewatch || KOR || align=right | 1.4 km || 
|-id=985 bgcolor=#d6d6d6
| 466985 ||  || — || September 5, 2008 || Kitt Peak || Spacewatch || EOS || align=right | 2.0 km || 
|-id=986 bgcolor=#fefefe
| 466986 ||  || — || September 21, 2009 || Kitt Peak || Spacewatch || H || align=right data-sort-value="0.66" | 660 m || 
|-id=987 bgcolor=#d6d6d6
| 466987 ||  || — || November 16, 2009 || Kitt Peak || Spacewatch || — || align=right | 2.9 km || 
|-id=988 bgcolor=#d6d6d6
| 466988 ||  || — || December 11, 2010 || Mount Lemmon || Mount Lemmon Survey || — || align=right | 2.9 km || 
|-id=989 bgcolor=#E9E9E9
| 466989 ||  || — || November 25, 2005 || Kitt Peak || Spacewatch || — || align=right | 2.2 km || 
|-id=990 bgcolor=#d6d6d6
| 466990 ||  || — || January 13, 2005 || Kitt Peak || Spacewatch || — || align=right | 2.7 km || 
|-id=991 bgcolor=#fefefe
| 466991 ||  || — || January 3, 2009 || Mount Lemmon || Mount Lemmon Survey || — || align=right | 1.0 km || 
|-id=992 bgcolor=#E9E9E9
| 466992 ||  || — || October 20, 2006 || Mount Lemmon || Mount Lemmon Survey || EUN || align=right | 1.9 km || 
|-id=993 bgcolor=#fefefe
| 466993 ||  || — || October 13, 2007 || Catalina || CSS || — || align=right data-sort-value="0.82" | 820 m || 
|-id=994 bgcolor=#E9E9E9
| 466994 ||  || — || March 12, 2008 || Kitt Peak || Spacewatch || — || align=right | 1.7 km || 
|-id=995 bgcolor=#fefefe
| 466995 ||  || — || April 15, 2001 || Kitt Peak || Spacewatch || — || align=right data-sort-value="0.93" | 930 m || 
|-id=996 bgcolor=#E9E9E9
| 466996 ||  || — || January 16, 2008 || Kitt Peak || Spacewatch || — || align=right data-sort-value="0.43" | 430 m || 
|-id=997 bgcolor=#d6d6d6
| 466997 ||  || — || March 11, 2005 || Socorro || LINEAR || — || align=right | 4.2 km || 
|-id=998 bgcolor=#d6d6d6
| 466998 ||  || — || February 16, 2010 || Kitt Peak || Spacewatch || — || align=right | 3.5 km || 
|-id=999 bgcolor=#fefefe
| 466999 ||  || — || September 19, 2007 || Kitt Peak || Spacewatch || — || align=right data-sort-value="0.70" | 700 m || 
|-id=000 bgcolor=#d6d6d6
| 467000 ||  || — || May 12, 2012 || Mount Lemmon || Mount Lemmon Survey || EOS || align=right | 2.1 km || 
|}

References

External links 
 Discovery Circumstances: Numbered Minor Planets (465001)–(470000) (IAU Minor Planet Center)

0466